= List of official matches of the Montenegro men's national volleyball team =

The Montenegro men's national volleyball team represents Montenegro in international men's volleyball competitions and friendly matches. The national volleyball team was formed in 2006, recently after independence. Montenegro is a full member of FIVB and CEV since 2006.
Montenegro played their first official match at 1 September 2007 in Podgorica and won against Latvia (3-1).
Until now, at major tournaments, Montenegro played in FIVB World League and European League. Montenegro made main success at 2014, winning the gold medal in European League.

== List of official matches ==
Below is a list of all official matches (under the FIVB/CEV) played by the national team since Montenegrin independence.
Win Loss

Date	Opponent	Result	Venue	Att	Competition
01/09/2007	Latvia	3–1	Podgorica	2,500	OGQ
09/09/2007	Latvia	3–2	Riga	3,000	OGQ
28/11/2007	Italy	0–3	Catania	2,000	OGQ
30/11/2007	Croatia	1–3	Catania	500	OGQ
06/05/2008	Norway	3–0	Podgorica	2,000	ECQ
10/05/2008	Norway	3–0	Oslo	500	ECQ
16/05/2008	Poland	0–3	Olsztyn	2,200	ECQ
17/05/2008	Hungary	3–1	Olsztyn	1,300	ECQ
18/05/2008	Estonia	1–3	Olsztyn	1,500	ECQ
23/05/2008	Estonia	1–3	Tallinn	1,000	ECQ
24/05/2008	Poland	3–2	Tallinn	500	ECQ
25/05/2008	Hungary	2–3	Tallinn	200	ECQ
21/05/2010	Croatia	3–0	Bar	2,200	ECQ
22/05/2010	Estonia	2–3	Bar	2,200	ECQ
23/05/2010	Germany	0–3	Bar	2,000	ECQ
28/05/2010	Estonia	2–3	Tübingen	500	ECQ
29/05/2010	Germany	0–3	Tübingen	1,200	ECQ
30/05/2010	Croatia	1–3	Tübingen	400	ECQ
26/08/2011	Macedonia	3–0	Pljevlja	1,500	OGQ
02/09/2011	Macedonia	3–2	Skopje	2,500	OGQ
22/11/2011	Turkey	0–3	Poprad	300	OGQ
23/11/2011	Estonia	3–2	Poprad	200	OGQ
06/09/2012	Finland	0–3	Trikala	300	ECQ
07/09/2012	Greece	3–0	Trikala	800	ECQ
08/09/2012	Romania	3–0	Trikala	200	ECQ
14/09/2012	Greece	2–3	Vantaa	300	ECQ
15/09/2012	Romania	2–3	Vantaa	500	ECQ
16/09/2012	Finland	2–3	Vantaa	1,000	ECQ
24/05/2013	Ukraine	1–3	Skopje	200	WCQ
25/05/2013	Macedonia	0–3	Skopje	1,000	WCQ
26/05/2013	Albania	3–1	Skopje	150	WCQ
15/06/2013	Hungary	3–0	Kecskemét	400	European League 2013
16/06/2013	Czech Republic	1–3	Kecskemét	200	European League 2013
16/06/2013	Spain	3–1	Kecskemét	200	European League 2013
21/06/2013	Spain	3–2	Barcelona	600	European League 2013
22/06/2013	Czech Republic	1–3	Barcelona	100	European League 2013
23/06/2013	Hungary	3–0	Barcelona	100	European League 2013
28/06/2013	Hungary	3–0	Podgorica	500	European League 2013
29/06/2013	Spain	1–3	Podgorica	700	European League 2013
30/06/2013	Czech Republic	3–2	Podgorica	500	European League 2013
05/07/2013	Spain	3–1	Opava	400	European League 2013
06/07/2013	Czech Republic	3–2	Opava	2,500	European League 2013
06/07/2013	Hungary	3–0	Opava	200	European League 2013
16/05/2014	Romania	2–3	Podgorica	500	ECQ
17/05/2014	Croatia	1–3	Podgorica	500	ECQ
18/05/2014	Netherlands	3–2	Podgorica	300	ECQ
23/05/2014	Netherlands	1–3	Zagreb	200	ECQ
24/05/2014	Croatia	3–2	Zagreb	500	ECQ
25/05/2014	Romania	3–2	Zagreb	100	ECQ
06/06/2014	Poland	3–2	Milicz	1,000	European League 2014
08/06/2014	Poland	3–1	Wałbrzych	2,200	European League 2014
20/06/2014	Romania	1–3	Craiova	500	European League 2014
21/06/2014	Romania	3–1	Craiova	500	European League 2014
28/06/2014	Azerbaijan	3–0	Budva	300	European League 2014
29/06/2014	Azerbaijan	3–0	Budva	200	European League 2014
05/07/2014	Greece	3–0	Budva	400	European League 2014
06/07/2014	Greece	1–3	Budva	300	European League 2014
10/07/2014	Macedonia	1–3	Skopje	2,000	European League 2014
16/07/2014	Macedonia	3–1	Budva	700	European League 2014
23/07/2014	Greece	3–2	Thessaloniki	2,500	FINAL
26/07/2014	Greece	3–1	Budva	1,500	FINAL
12/06/2015	Tunisia	3–0	Podgorica	3,000	World League 2015
13/06/2015	Puerto Rico	3–0	Podgorica	2,000	World League 2015
14/06/2015	Turkey	3–1	Podgorica	2,200	World League 2015
19/06/2015	Tunisia	3–0	Istanbul	300	World League 2015
20/06/2015	Puerto Rico	3–1	Istanbul	200	World League 2015
21/06/2015	Turkey	2–3	Istanbul	500	World League 2015
04/07/2015	China	3–1	Bratislava	1,500	World League 2015
05/07/2015	Egypt	2–3	Bratislava	1,500	World League 2015
17/06/2016	Germany	3–2	Mexico City	600	World League 2016
18/06/2016	Mexico	3–1	Mexico City	1,000	World League 2016
19/06/2016	Spain	3–2	Mexico City	700	World League 2016
24/06/2016	Venezuela	2–3	Tunis	200	World League 2016
25/06/2016	Tunisia	2–3	Tunis	600	World League 2016
26/06/2016	Mexico	3–1	Tunis	100	World League 2016
16/09/2016	Switzerland	3–0	Podgorica	1,800	ECQ
17/09/2016	Spain	3–2	Podgorica	2,000	ECQ
18/09/2016	Germany	0–3	Podgorica	2,500	ECQ
23/09/2016	Germany	0–3	Las Palmas	500	ECQ
24/09/2016	Spain	1–3	Las Palmas	1,000	ECQ
25/09/2016	Switzerland	3–0	Las Palmas	200	ECQ
24/05/2017	Russia	0–3	Tallinn	150	WCQ
25/05/2017	Hungary	3–2	Tallinn	100	WCQ
26/05/2017	Estonia	0–3	Tallinn	1,000	WCQ
27/05/2017	Romania	1–3	Tallinn	100	WCQ
28/05/2017	Kosovo	3–0	Tallinn	150	WCQ
02/06/2017	Tunisia	3–2	Bijelo Polje	700	World League 2017
03/06/2017	Chinese Taipei	3–1	Bijelo Polje	500	World League 2017
04/06/2017	Estonia	0–3	Bijelo Polje	500	World League 2017
09/06/2017	Chinese Taipei	1–3	Tunis	200	World League 2017
10/06/2017	Kazakhstan	3–0	Tunis	100	World League 2017
11/06/2017	Tunisia	2–3	Tunis	600	World League 2017
15/08/2018	Moldova	2–3	Chișinău	1,100	ECQ
19/08/2018	Slovakia	3–0	Bar	700	ECQ
22/08/2018	Iceland	3–0	Bar	300	ECQ
26/08/2018	Iceland	3–0	Kópavogur	250	ECQ
05/01/2019	Slovakia	0–3	Nitra	2,500	ECQ
09/01/2019	Moldova	3–0	Budva	1,000	ECQ
28/05/2019	Iceland	3–1	Budva	600	GSS
29/05/2019	Luxembourg	3–0	Budva	300	GSS
30/05/2019	Cyprus	3–1	Budva	500	GSS
31/05/2019	San Marino	3–0	Budva	300	GSS
01/06/2019	Monaco	3–0	Budva	400	GSS
13/09/2019	Netherlands	0–3	Rotterdam	3,000	European Championship 2019
14/09/2019	Estonia	3–0	Rotterdam	400	European Championship 2019
16/09/2019	Ukraine	1–3	Rotterdam	500	European Championship 2019
17/09/2019	Poland	0–3	Rotterdam	1,100	European Championship 2019
18/09/2019	Czech Republic	3–2	Rotterdam	500	European Championship 2019
07/05/2021	Azerbaijan	3–1	Tbilisi	0	ECQ
08/05/2021	Greece	2–3	Tbilisi	0	ECQ
09/05/2021	Georgia	3–0	Tbilisi	0	ECQ
14/05/2021	Azerbaijan	3–1	Podgorica	0	ECQ
15/05/2021	Georgia	3–0	Podgorica	0	ECQ
16/05/2021	Greece	3–0	Podgorica	0	ECQ
03/09/2021	Bulgaria	0–3	Ostrava	650	European Championship 2021
04/09/2021	Slovenia	0–3	Ostrava	0	European Championship 2021
05/09/2021	Italy	0–3	Ostrava	411	European Championship 2021
07/09/2021	Czech Republic	0–3	Ostrava	2,253	European Championship 2021
08/09/2021	Belarus	0–3	Ostrava	67	European Championship 2021

WCQ - World Championship qualifiers;
ECQ - European Championship qualifiers;
OGQ - Olympic Games qualifiers;
GSS - Games of the Small States of Europe

== Montenegro vs. other countries ==
Below is the list of performances of Montenegro women's national volleyball team against every single opponent.

Opponents' country	Pld	W	L	Sets (W-L)
Albania	1	1	0	3-1
Azerbaijan	4	4	0	12-1
Bulgaria	1	0	1	0-3
Belarus	1	0	1	0-3
China	1	1	0	3-1
Chinese Taipei	2	1	1	4-4
Croatia	5	2	3	9-11
Cyprus	1	1	0	3-1
Czech Republic	6	3	3	11-15
Egypt	1	0	1	2-3
Estonia	8	2	6	12-20
Finland	2	0	2	2-6
Germany	5	1	4	3-14
Georgia	2	2	0	6-0
Greece	8	5	3	20-12
Hungary	7	6	1	17-5
Iceland	3	3	0	9-1
Italy	2	0	2	0-6
Kazakhstan	1	1	0	3-0
Kosovo	1	1	0	3-0
Latvia	2	2	0	6-3
Luxembourg	1	1	0	3-0
Macedonia	5	3	2	10-9
Mexico	2	2	0	6-2
Moldova	2	1	1	5-3
Monaco	1	1	0	3-0
Netherlands	3	1	2	4-8
Norway	2	2	0	6-0
Poland	5	3	2	9-11
Puerto Rico	2	2	0	6-1
Romania	7	3	4	13-13
Russia	1	0	1	0-3
San Marino	1	1	0	3-0
Slovakia	2	1	1	3-3
Slovenia	1	0	1	0-3
Spain	7	5	2	17-14
Switzerland	2	2	0	6-0
Tunisia	5	3	2	13-8
Turkey	3	1	2	5-7
Ukraine	2	0	2	2-6
Venezuela	1	0	1	2-3
Overall	119	68	51	244-205

* Statistics correct as of end 2021 European Volleyball Championship.

== See also ==
- Montenegro men's national volleyball team
- Volleyball Federation of Montenegro (OSCG)
- Montenegrin Volleyball League
