= 2017 Men's European Volleyball Championship qualification =

This is an article about qualification for the 2017 Men's European Volleyball Championship.

== Qualification summary ==
Means of qualification	Qualifier
Host Country	Poland
2015 European Championship	France
2015 European Championship	Slovenia
2015 European Championship	Italy
2015 European Championship	Bulgaria
2015 European Championship	Russia
2015 European Championship	Serbia

Means of qualification		Qualifier
Second Round Winners	Pool A	Germany
Second Round Winners	Pool B	Finland
Second Round Winners	Pool C	Belgium
Second Round Winners	Pool D	Slovakia
Second Round Winners	Pool E	Netherlands
Second Round Winners	Pool F	Czech Republic
Third Round Winners		Turkey
Third Round Winners		Spain
Third Round Winners		Estonia

Total 16

== Pool standing procedure ==
1. Number of matches won
2. Match points
3. Sets ratio
4. Points ratio
5. Result of the last match between the tied teams

Match won 3–0 or 3–1: 3 match points for the winner, 0 match points for the loser
Match won 3–2: 2 match points for the winner, 1 match point for the loser

== Direct qualification ==
The host country team(s) and the best ranked teams in 2015 European Championship, total 7 teams, directly qualified for 2017 European Championship.

Qualified for the 2017 European Championship
Qualified for the 2017 European Championship as host country

Rank	Team
1st place, gold medalist(s)	France
2nd place, silver medalist(s)	Slovenia
3rd place, bronze medalist(s)	Italy
4	Bulgaria
5	Poland
6	Russia
7	Serbia
8	Germany
9	Netherlands
10	Belgium
11	Estonia
12	Finland
13	Czech Republic
14	Slovakia
15	Croatia
16	Belarus

== First round ==
First round was held 19–22 May 2016. 12 teams competed in three first round tournaments consisting of 4 teams. The three 1st placed teams and the two 2nd placed teams with the best score qualified for the second round.

- Pools composition

Pool 1	Pool 2	Pool 3
Sweden	Austria	Israel
Azerbaijan	Luxembourg	Hungary
Switzerland	Moldova	Norway
Georgia	Lithuania	England

All times are local.

=== Pool 1 ===
- Venue: New Volleyball Arena, Tbilisi, Georgia

Pos	Team	Pld	W	L	Pts	SW	SL	SR	SPW	SPL	SPR	Qualification
1	Sweden	3	3	0	7	9	4	2.250	292	246	1.187	Second round
2	Switzerland	3	2	1	7	8	3	2.667	238	207	1.150	Second round
3	Azerbaijan	3	1	2	4	5	6	0.833	236	235	1.004	
4	Georgia	3	0	3	0	0	9	0.000	147	225	0.653	

Date	Time		Score		Set 1	Set 2	Set 3	Set 4	Set 5	Total	Report
19 May	15:30	Sweden	3–2	Azerbaijan	25–16	21–25	25–23	24–26	15–12	110–102	Report
19 May	18:30	Georgia	0–3	Switzerland	13–25	12–25	16–25			41–75	Report
20 May	15:30	Azerbaijan	0–3	Switzerland	20–25	18–25	21–25			59–75	Report
20 May	18:30	Sweden	3–0	Georgia	25–19	25–19	25–18			75–56	Report
21 May	15:30	Switzerland	2–3	Sweden	25–18	12–25	12–25	25–23	14–16	88–107	Report
21 May	18:30	Azerbaijan	3–0	Georgia	25–21	25–17	25–12			75–50	Report

=== Pool 2 ===
- Venue: d'Coque Gymnase, Luxembourg City, Luxembourg

Pos	Team	Pld	W	L	Pts	SW	SL	SR	SPW	SPL	SPR	Qualification
1	Austria	3	3	0	8	9	3	3.000	274	220	1.245	Second round
2	Moldova	3	2	1	7	8	3	2.667	243	202	1.203	Second round
3	Luxembourg	3	1	2	2	4	8	0.500	242	266	0.910	
4	Lithuania	3	0	3	1	2	9	0.222	188	259	0.726	

Date	Time		Score		Set 1	Set 2	Set 3	Set 4	Set 5	Total	Report
20 May	17:00	Austria	3–2	Moldova	19–25	25–17	21–25	25–15	15–11	105–93	Report
20 May	19:30	Luxembourg	3–2	Lithuania	25–23	25–13	20–25	24–26	15–10	109–97	Report
21 May	17:00	Moldova	3–0	Lithuania	25–13	25–19	25–16			75–48	Report
21 May	19:30	Austria	3–1	Luxembourg	25–22	19–25	25–20	25–17		94–84	Report
22 May	15:30	Lithuania	0–3	Austria	14–25	16–25	13–25			43–75	Report
22 May	18:00	Moldova	3–0	Luxembourg	25–15	25–14	25–20			75–49	Report

=== Pool 3 ===
- Venue: Sotra Arena, Straume, Norway

Pos	Team	Pld	W	L	Pts	SW	SL	SR	SPW	SPL	SPR	Qualification
1	Israel	3	3	0	8	9	3	3.000	279	240	1.163	Second round
2	Norway	3	2	1	6	8	6	1.333	310	279	1.111	
3	England	3	1	2	2	5	8	0.625	260	302	0.861	
4	Hungary	3	0	3	2	4	9	0.444	266	294	0.905	

Date	Time		Score		Set 1	Set 2	Set 3	Set 4	Set 5	Total	Report
20 May	15:30	Hungary	0–3	Israel	24–26	18–25	17–25			59–76	Report
20 May	18:00	Norway	3–1	England	25–19	22–25	25–19	25–11		97–74	Report
21 May	15:00	Israel	3–1	England	25–20	23–25	25–15	25–14		98–74	Report
21 May	17:30	Hungary	2–3	Norway	25–20	25–21	20–25	17–25	13–15	100–106	Report
22 May	15:00	England	3–2	Hungary	25–17	26–28	28–26	18–25	15–11	112–107	Report
22 May	17:30	Israel	3–2	Norway	25–23	22–25	25–20	17–25	16–14	105–107	Report

=== Ranking of the 2nd placed teams ===
Pos	Team	Pld	W	L	Pts	SW	SL	SR	SPW	SPL	SPR	Qualification
1	Moldova	3	2	1	7	8	3	2.667	243	202	1.203	Second round
2	Switzerland	3	2	1	7	8	3	2.667	238	207	1.150	Second round
3	Norway	3	2	1	6	8	6	1.333	310	279	1.111	

== Second round ==
24 teams competed in the second round, where each pool of 4 teams played in 2 tournaments in 15–25 September 2016. The 1st placed teams of each pool qualified directly for the 2017 Championship. The 2nd placed teams of each pool qualified for the third round.

- Pools composition

Pool A	Pool B	Pool C	Pool D	Pool E	Pool F
Germany	Finland	Belgium	Slovakia	Netherlands	Czech Republic
Spain	Portugal	Greece	Croatia	Turkey	Estonia
Montenegro	Denmark	Ukraine	Latvia	Belarus	Macedonia
Switzerland	Sweden	Moldova	Israel	Austria	Romania

All times are local.

=== Pool A ===
Pos	Team	Pld	W	L	Pts	SW	SL	SR	SPW	SPL	SPR	Qualification
1	Germany	6	6	0	18	18	1	18.000	470	344	1.366	2017 European Championship
2	Spain	6	3	3	10	12	11	1.091	513	499	1.028	Third round
3	Montenegro	6	3	3	8	10	11	0.909	432	469	0.921	
4	Switzerland	6	0	6	0	1	18	0.056	370	473	0.782	

==== Tournament 1 ====
- Venue: Morača Sports Center, Podgorica, Montenegro

Date	Time		Score		Set 1	Set 2	Set 3	Set 4	Set 5	Total	Report
16 Sep	16:30	Spain	0–3	Germany	23–25	23–25	16–25			62–75	Report
16 Sep	19:00	Montenegro	3–0	Switzerland	25–21	25–23	25–18			75–62	Report
17 Sep	16:30	Germany	3–0	Switzerland	25–22	25–16	25–16			75–54	Report
17 Sep	19:00	Spain	2–3	Montenegro	25–22	24–26	16–25	25–23	13–15	103–111	Report
18 Sep	16:30	Switzerland	0–3	Spain	22–25	21–25	21–25			64–75	Report
18 Sep	19:00	Germany	3–0	Montenegro	25–18	25–21	25–18			75–57	Report

==== Tournament 2 ====
- Venue: Centro Insular de Deportes, Las Palmas, Spain

Date	Time		Score		Set 1	Set 2	Set 3	Set 4	Set 5	Total	Report
23 Sep	17:30	Montenegro	0–3	Germany	13–25	11–25	15–25			39–75	Report
23 Sep	20:00	Spain	3–1	Switzerland	25–21	23–25	25–18	25–15		98–79	Report
24 Sep	17:30	Germany	3–0	Switzerland	25–20	25–14	25–18			75–52	Report
24 Sep	20:00	Montenegro	1–3	Spain	18–25	25–20	17–25	15–25		75–95	Report
25 Sep	15:30	Switzerland	0–3	Montenegro	14–25	22–25	23–25			59–75	Report
25 Sep	18:00	Germany	3–1	Spain	25–19	25–21	20–25	25–15		95–80	Report

=== Pool B ===
Pos	Team	Pld	W	L	Pts	SW	SL	SR	SPW	SPL	SPR	Qualification
1	Finland	6	5	1	15	15	6	2.500	504	423	1.191	2017 European Championship
2	Portugal	6	4	2	11	14	10	1.400	548	542	1.011	Third round
3	Sweden	6	3	3	9	12	12	1.000	528	535	0.987	
4	Denmark	6	0	6	1	5	18	0.278	473	553	0.855	

==== Tournament 1 ====
- Venue: Humlehøjhallen, Sønderborg, Denmark

Date	Time		Score		Set 1	Set 2	Set 3	Set 4	Set 5	Total	Report
16 Sep	16:00	Portugal	3–0	Finland	25–23	25–23	25–20			75–66	Report
16 Sep	19:00	Denmark	0–3	Sweden	19–25	22–25	19–25			60–75	Report
17 Sep	16:00	Finland	3–1	Sweden	21–25	25–14	26–24	25–21		97–84	Report
17 Sep	19:00	Portugal	3–1	Denmark	23–25	25–23	28–26	25–15		101–89	Report
18 Sep	16:00	Sweden	2–3	Portugal	25–22	18–25	25–22	23–25	10–15	101–109	Report
18 Sep	19:00	Finland	3–1	Denmark	25–17	18–25	25–11	25–21		93–74	Report

==== Tournament 2 ====
- Venue: Helsinki Ice Hall, Helsinki, Finland

Date	Time		Score		Set 1	Set 2	Set 3	Set 4	Set 5	Total	Report
23 Sep	15:00	Portugal	3–1	Denmark	25–22	25–21	22–25	25–23		97–91	Report
23 Sep	18:00	Finland	3–0	Sweden	25–22	25–15	25–22			75–59	Report
24 Sep	15:00	Denmark	2–3	Sweden	31–29	19–25	20–25	25–18	12–15	107–112	Report
24 Sep	18:00	Portugal	1–3	Finland	22–25	25–23	17–25	15–25		79–98	Report
25 Sep	16:00	Denmark	0–3	Finland	14–25	20–25	18–25			52–75	Report
25 Sep	19:00	Sweden	3–1	Portugal	22–25	25–22	25–17	25–23		97–87	Report

=== Pool C ===
Pos	Team	Pld	W	L	Pts	SW	SL	SR	SPW	SPL	SPR	Qualification
1	Belgium	6	5	1	14	15	5	3.000	476	415	1.147	2017 European Championship
2	Greece	6	5	1	14	15	7	2.143	525	478	1.098	Third round
3	Ukraine	6	2	4	7	10	15	0.667	535	555	0.964	
4	Moldova	6	0	6	1	5	18	0.278	467	555	0.841	

==== Tournament 1 ====
- Venue: Kozani New Indoor Sporthall, Kozani, Greece

Date	Time		Score		Set 1	Set 2	Set 3	Set 4	Set 5	Total	Report
16 Sep	18:00	Moldova	2–3	Ukraine	25–17	16–25	22–25	25–22	8–15	96–104	Report
16 Sep	21:00	Greece	0–3	Belgium	17–25	23–25	22–25			62–75	Report
17 Sep	18:00	Ukraine	2–3	Belgium	23–25	21–25	25–21	25–22	13–15	107–108	Report
17 Sep	21:00	Moldova	1–3	Greece	25–22	27–29	18–25	21–25		91–101	Report
18 Sep	18:00	Belgium	3–0	Moldova	25–18	25–14	25–19			75–51	Report
18 Sep	21:00	Ukraine	2–3	Greece	19–25	27–29	26–24	25–23	11–15	108–116	Report

==== Tournament 2 ====
- Venue: Lotto Arena, Antwerp, Belgium

Date	Time		Score		Set 1	Set 2	Set 3	Set 4	Set 5	Total	Report
22 Sep	17:30	Ukraine	3–1	Moldova	25–19	25–23	23–25	25–18		98–85	Report
23 Sep	15:00	Greece	3–1	Moldova	25–22	21–25	25–22	25–15		96–84	Report
23 Sep	20:00	Belgium	3–0	Ukraine	25–20	25–21	25–19			75–60	Report
24 Sep	17:30	Greece	3–0	Belgium	25–19	25–22	25–21			75–62	Report
25 Sep	15:00	Moldova	0–3	Belgium	15–25	29–31	16–25			60–81	Report
25 Sep	20:00	Ukraine	0–3	Greece	17–25	22–25	19–25			58–75	Report

=== Pool D ===
Pos	Team	Pld	W	L	Pts	SW	SL	SR	SPW	SPL	SPR	Qualification
1	Slovakia	6	5	1	15	16	4	4.000	483	411	1.175	2017 European Championship
2	Latvia	6	5	1	15	15	6	2.500	501	447	1.121	Third round
3	Israel	6	2	4	4	7	16	0.438	464	533	0.871	
4	Croatia	6	0	6	2	6	18	0.333	497	554	0.897	

==== Tournament 1 ====
- Venue: Poprad Ice Stadium, Poprad, Slovakia

Date	Time		Score		Set 1	Set 2	Set 3	Set 4	Set 5	Total	Report
16 Sep	15:30	Latvia	3–0	Croatia	25–19	25–21	25–19			75–59	Report
16 Sep	18:00	Slovakia	3–0	Israel	26–24	25–18	25–13			76–55	Report
17 Sep	15:30	Croatia	2–3	Israel	25–19	25–21	22–25	18–25	16–18	106–108	Report
17 Sep	18:00	Latvia	0–3	Slovakia	25–27	21–25	21–25			67–77	Report
18 Sep	15:30	Israel	1–3	Latvia	18–25	25–20	20–25	19–25		82–95	Report
18 Sep	18:00	Croatia	1–3	Slovakia	21–25	25–18	24–26	22–25		92–94	Report

==== Tournament 2 ====
- Venue: Dvorana Gimnasium, Rovinj, Croatia

Date	Time		Score		Set 1	Set 2	Set 3	Set 4	Set 5	Total	Report
22 Sep	17:30	Slovakia	1–3	Latvia	17–25	22–25	25–17	22–25		86–92	Report
22 Sep	20:00	Croatia	2–3	Israel	20–25	25–20	25–20	23–25	13–15	106–105	Report
23 Sep	17:30	Israel	0–3	Latvia	15–25	18–25	23–25			56–75	Report
24 Sep	15:00	Israel	0–3	Slovakia	21–25	19–25	18–25			58–75	Report
24 Sep	17:30	Latvia	3–1	Croatia	25–23	20–25	25–14	27–25		97–87	Report
25 Sep	17:30	Croatia	0–3	Slovakia	16–25	17–25	14–25			47–75	Report

=== Pool E ===
Pos	Team	Pld	W	L	Pts	SW	SL	SR	SPW	SPL	SPR	Qualification
1	Netherlands	6	6	0	16	18	6	3.000	561	492	1.140	2017 European Championship
2	Turkey	6	4	2	13	15	8	1.875	533	499	1.068	Third round
3	Belarus	6	2	4	6	9	15	0.600	524	531	0.987	
4	Austria	6	0	6	1	5	18	0.278	466	562	0.829	

==== Tournament 1 ====
- Venue: Yildirim Beyazit Sports Hall, Turgutlu, Turkey

Date	Time		Score		Set 1	Set 2	Set 3	Set 4	Set 5	Total	Report
15 Sep	17:00	Austria	1–3	Turkey	23–25	18–25	25–23	15–25		81–98	Report
15 Sep	20:00	Belarus	0–3	Netherlands	20–25	21–25	17–25			58–75	Report
16 Sep	17:00	Turkey	2–3	Netherlands	16–25	25–18	26–24	23–25	6–15	96–107	Report
16 Sep	20:00	Austria	1–3	Belarus	17–25	19–25	25–23	21–25		82–98	Report
17 Sep	17:00	Turkey	3–0	Belarus	25–23	25–18	25–22			75–63	Report
17 Sep	20:00	Netherlands	3–1	Austria	30–32	25–20	25–20	25–21		105–93	Report

==== Tournament 2 ====
- Venue: Topsportcentrum de Koog, Koog aan de Zaan, Netherlands

Date	Time		Score		Set 1	Set 2	Set 3	Set 4	Set 5	Total	Report
23 Sep	17:00	Turkey	3–1	Belarus	25–18	29–27	20–25	25–22		99–92	Report
23 Sep	19:30	Austria	0–3	Netherlands	17–25	11–25	24–26			52–76	Report
24 Sep	17:00	Belarus	2–3	Netherlands	25–20	25–18	18–25	23–25	13–15	104–103	Report
24 Sep	19:30	Turkey	3–0	Austria	25–18	26–24	25–19			76–61	Report
25 Sep	15:30	Netherlands	3–1	Turkey	19–25	25–22	26–24	25–18		95–89	Report
25 Sep	18:00	Belarus	3–2	Austria	21–25	25–20	23–25	25–19	15–8	109–97	Report

=== Pool F ===
Pos	Team	Pld	W	L	Pts	SW	SL	SR	SPW	SPL	SPR	Qualification
1	Czech Republic	6	5	1	15	15	5	3.000	479	426	1.124	2017 European Championship
2	Estonia	6	3	3	8	11	12	0.917	515	515	1.000	Third round
3	Macedonia	6	2	4	7	9	14	0.643	500	548	0.912	
4	Romania	6	2	4	6	9	13	0.692	509	514	0.990	

==== Tournament 1 ====
- Venue: Sala Polivalentă, Craiova, Romania

Date	Time		Score		Set 1	Set 2	Set 3	Set 4	Set 5	Total	Report
15 Sep	17:00	Estonia	0–3	Czech Republic	20–25	19–25	14–25			53–75	Report
15 Sep	19:45	Romania	3–0	Macedonia	25–21	25–14	25–12			75–47	Report
16 Sep	17:00	Czech Republic	3–1	Macedonia	25–17	25–18	23–25	27–25		100–85	Report
16 Sep	19:45	Estonia	3–1	Romania	19–25	28–26	25–18	25–23		97–92	Report
17 Sep	17:00	Macedonia	2–3	Estonia	28–26	22–25	23–25	27–25	11–15	111–116	Report
17 Sep	19:45	Czech Republic	3–0	Romania	25–13	25–17	25–21			75–51	Report

==== Tournament 2 ====
- Venue: Jablonec City Hall, Jablonec nad Nisou, Czech Republic

Date	Time		Score		Set 1	Set 2	Set 3	Set 4	Set 5	Total	Report
23 Sep	15:00	Romania	3–1	Estonia	23–25	25–22	25–19	25–23		98–89	Report
23 Sep	18:00	Czech Republic	3–0	Macedonia	25–19	26–24	25–22			76–65	Report
24 Sep	15:00	Estonia	1–3	Macedonia	25–13	21–25	23–25	16–25		85–88	Report
24 Sep	18:00	Romania	1–3	Czech Republic	22–25	29–31	25–21	21–25		97–102	Report
25 Sep	15:00	Macedonia	3–1	Romania	29–31	25–22	25–21	25–22		104–96	Report
25 Sep	18:00	Estonia	3–0	Czech Republic	25–17	25–13	25–21			75–51	Report

== Third round ==
The 2nd placed teams of the second round will play one home and one away match to determine the 3 winners who will then subsequently be qualified through to the 2017 Championship. The third round matches will be held on 1–9 October 2016.

Team 1	Agg.	Team 2	1st leg	2nd leg
Turkey	5–1	Portugal	3–0	3–2
Spain	4–2	Greece	3–0	2–3
Latvia	1–5	Estonia	2–3	0–3

=== First leg ===
Date	Time		Score		Set 1	Set 2	Set 3	Set 4	Set 5	Total	Report
1 Oct	17:00	Latvia	2–3	Estonia	17–25	25–16	19–25	25–22	12–15	98–103	Report
1 Oct	21:00	Spain	3–0	Greece	25–16	25–21	25–17			75–54	Report
2 Oct	16:00	Turkey	3–0	Portugal	28–26	25–14	25–22			78–62	Report

=== Second leg ===
Date	Time		Score		Set 1	Set 2	Set 3	Set 4	Set 5	Total	Report
8 Oct	19:00	Greece	3–2	Spain	20–25	25–22	25–14	26–28	17–15	113–104	Report
9 Oct	17:00	Estonia	3–0	Latvia	25–20	25–19	25–16			75–55	Report
9 Oct	18:00	Portugal	2–3	Turkey	21–25	25–18	25–19	20–25	12–15	103–102	Report
