= 2026 Men's European Volleyball Championship qualification =

Volleyball Championship qualifiers

This article describes the qualification for the 2026 Men's European Volleyball Championship.

== Qualification ==
Bulgaria, Finland, Italy and Romania as host countries were directly qualified. The eight best placed teams at the 2023 edition also gained direct entries into the tournament. 21 teams compete for the remaining 12 places at the final tournament.

Means of qualification	Qualifier	Means of qualification		Qualifier
Host Countries	Bulgaria	Qualification	Pool A	Denmark
Host Countries	Finland	Qualification	Pool B	Belgium
Host Countries	Italy	Qualification	Pool C	Czechia
Host Countries	Romania	Qualification	Pool D	Estonia
2023 European Championship	Poland	Qualification	Pool E	Switzerland
2023 European Championship	Slovenia	Qualification	Pool F	Greece
2023 European Championship	France	Qualification	Pool G	Slovakia
2023 European Championship	Netherlands	Qualification	Best runners-up	Latvia
2023 European Championship	Serbia	Qualification	Best runners-up	Turkey
2023 European Championship	Ukraine	Qualification	Best runners-up	Israel
2023 European Championship	Germany	Qualification	Best runners-up	Sweden
2023 European Championship	Portugal	Qualification	Best runners-up	North Macedonia
Total 24

=== Direct qualification ===
All of the host countries' teams directly qualified for the tournament. Then, the top eight teams from previous edition also automatically qualified.

- 2023 Men's European Volleyball Championship final standings

Qualified for the 2026 European Championship
Qualified as hosts for the 2026 European Championship

Rank	Team
1st place, gold medalist(s)	Poland
2nd place, silver medalist(s)	Italy
3rd place, bronze medalist(s)	Slovenia
4	France
5	Netherlands
6	Serbia
7	Romania
8	Ukraine
9	Germany
10	Portugal
11	Croatia
12	Czechia
13	Turkey
14	Belgium
15	Bulgaria
16	North Macedonia
17	Spain
18	Israel
19	Montenegro
20	Estonia
21	Finland
22	Greece
23	Switzerland
24	Denmark

== Format ==
There are seven pools of three teams each; the winners of each pool and the best five runners-up will qualify for the 2026 European Championship. The pools are played in a double round-robin.

=== Schedule ===
Original schedule
Round	Round date
Matchday 1	17/18 August 2024
Matchday 2	24/25 August 2024
Matchday 3	31 August–1 September 2024
Matchday 4	14/15 June 2025
Matchday 5	21/22 June 2025
Matchday 6	28/29 June 2025

The dates were updated to adapt to the new FIVB calendar.

Round	Round date
Matchday 1	17/18 August 2024
Matchday 2	24/25 August 2024
Matchday 3	28/29 August 2024
Matchday 4	9/10 August 2025
Matchday 5	13 August 2025
Matchday 6	16/17 August 2025

== Pools composition ==
The pools were set following the Serpentine system according to their European Ranking for national teams as of 6 November 2023. Rankings are shown in parentheses.

Pool A	Pool B	Pool C	Pool D	Pool E	Pool F	Pool G
Turkey (8)	Belgium (11)	Czech Republic (13)	Croatia (16)	Spain (17)	Greece (18)	Slovakia (19)
Denmark (27)	Azerbaijan (26)	Montenegro (24)	Estonia (23)	Switzerland (22)	North Macedonia (21)	Latvia (20)
Hungary (28)	Austria (29)	Norway (31)	Israel (34)	Sweden (35)	Georgia (37)	Kosovo (NR)

== Pool standing procedure ==
1. Number of matches won
2. Match points
3. Sets ratio
4. Points ratio
5. If the tie continues as per the point ratio between two teams, the priority will be given to the team which won the last match between them. When the tie in points ratio is between three or more teams, a new classification of these teams in the terms of points 1, 2 and 3 will be made taking into consideration only the matches in which they were opposed to each other.

Match won 3–0 or 3–1: 3 match points for the winner, 0 match points for the loser
Match won 3–2: 2 match points for the winner, 1 match point for the loser

== Results ==
- The winners in each pool and the top five of the second-ranked teams will qualify for the 2026 European Championship.

=== Pool A ===
Pos	Team	Pld	W	L	Pts	SW	SL	SR	SPW	SPL	SPR	Qualification
1	Denmark	4	3	1	10	11	3	3.667	317	281	1.128	2026 European Championship
2	Turkey	4	3	1	8	9	5	1.800	326	253	1.289	2026 European Championship
3	Hungary	4	0	4	0	0	12	0.000	191	300	0.637	

Source: CEV

Date	Time		Score		Set 1	Set 2	Set 3	Set 4	Set 5	Total	Report
17 Aug 2024	18:30	Hungary	0–3	Denmark	13–25	20–25	18–25			51–75	Report
25 Aug 2024	16:00	Denmark	3–0	Turkey	25–23	25–23	27–25			77–71	Report
29 Aug 2024	18:00	Turkey	3–0	Hungary	25–11	25–10	25–17			75–38	Report
9 Aug 2025	18:00	Hungary	0–3	Turkey	16–25	17–25	15–25			48–75	Report
13 Aug 2025	18:00	Turkey	3–2	Denmark	21–25	25–20	19–25	25–10	15–10	105–90	Report
17 Aug 2025	18:00	Denmark	3–0	Hungary	25–17	25–18	25–19			75–54	Report

=== Pool B ===
Pos	Team	Pld	W	L	Pts	SW	SL	SR	SPW	SPL	SPR	Qualification
1	Belgium	4	4	0	12	12	1	12.000	325	218	1.491	2026 European Championship
2	Austria	4	2	2	6	7	6	1.167	285	271	1.052	
3	Azerbaijan	4	0	4	0	0	12	0.000	179	300	0.597	

Source: CEV

Date	Time		Score		Set 1	Set 2	Set 3	Set 4	Set 5	Total	Report
17 Aug 2024	20:30	Austria	3–0	Azerbaijan	25–16	25–23	25–14			75–53	Report
24 Aug 2024	16:00	Azerbaijan	0–3	Belgium	17–25	12–25	19–25			48–75	Report
28 Aug 2024	18:00	Belgium	3–0	Austria	25–19	25–14	25–21			75–54	Report
9 Aug 2025	20:20	Austria	1–3	Belgium	15–25	21–25	27–25	18–25		81–100	Report
13 Aug 2025	20:15	Belgium	3–0	Azerbaijan	25–13	25–9	25–13			75–35	Report
16 Aug 2025	18:00	Azerbaijan	0–3	Austria	13–25	12–25	18–25			43–75	Report

=== Pool C ===
Pos	Team	Pld	W	L	Pts	SW	SL	SR	SPW	SPL	SPR	Qualification
1	Czech Republic	4	4	0	12	12	2	6.000	343	279	1.229	2026 European Championship
2	Norway	4	1	3	3	5	9	0.556	303	334	0.907	
3	Montenegro	4	1	3	3	4	10	0.400	303	336	0.902	

Source: CEV

Date	Time		Score		Set 1	Set 2	Set 3	Set 4	Set 5	Total	Report
18 Aug 2024	14:30	Norway	3–0	Montenegro	25–19	28–26	25–20			78–65	Report
24 Aug 2024	18:00	Montenegro	1–3	Czech Republic	25–20	18–25	22–25	21–25		86–95	Report
29 Aug 2024	17:00	Czech Republic	3–0	Norway	25–17	25–14	25–20			75–51	Report
9 Aug 2025	17:00	Norway	1–3	Czech Republic	25–23	19–25	22–25	20–25		86–98	Report
13 Aug 2025	18:00	Czech Republic	3–0	Montenegro	25–16	25–22	25–18			75–56	Report
17 Aug 2025	19:00	Montenegro	3–1	Norway	30–28	25–17	16–25	25–18		96–88	Report

=== Pool D ===
Pos	Team	Pld	W	L	Pts	SW	SL	SR	SPW	SPL	SPR	Qualification
1	Estonia	4	3	1	10	11	5	2.200	373	337	1.107	2026 European Championship
2	Israel	4	3	1	7	10	8	1.250	404	397	1.018	2026 European Championship
3	Croatia	4	0	4	1	4	12	0.333	334	377	0.886	

Source: CEV

Date	Time		Score		Set 1	Set 2	Set 3	Set 4	Set 5	Total	Report
17 Aug 2024	19:00	Estonia	3–1	Israel	26–24	25–22	19–25	25–18		95–89	Report
21 Aug 2024	18:00	Croatia	1–3	Israel	22–25	25–23	22–25	23–25		92–98	Report
24 Aug 2024	16:00	Estonia	3–0	Croatia	25–16	25–19	25–22			75–57	Report
10 Aug 2025	20:00	Israel	3–2	Croatia	25–22	18–25	25–21	24–26	15–10	107–104	Report
13 Aug 2025	19:00	Croatia	1–3	Estonia	20–25	25–22	16–25	20–25		81–97	Report
16 Aug 2025	20:00	Israel	3–2	Estonia	18–25	28–26	21–25	25–14	18–16	110–106	Report

=== Pool E ===
Pos	Team	Pld	W	L	Pts	SW	SL	SR	SPW	SPL	SPR	Qualification
1	Switzerland	4	4	0	9	12	6	2.000	390	352	1.108	2026 European Championship
2	Sweden	4	2	2	8	10	7	1.429	373	362	1.030	2026 European Championship
3	Spain	4	0	4	1	3	12	0.250	304	353	0.861	

Source: CEV

Date	Time		Score		Set 1	Set 2	Set 3	Set 4	Set 5	Total	Report
17 Aug 2024	18:05	Sweden	2–3	Switzerland	25–15	25–20	21–25	19–25	11–15	101–100	Report
25 Aug 2024	17:00	Switzerland	3–2	Spain	25–16	25–23	19–25	22–25	15–9	106–98	Report
28 Aug 2024	20:00	Spain	0–3	Sweden	21–25	20–25	19–25			60–75	Report
9 Aug 2025	18:00	Sweden	3–1	Spain	22–25	25–23	25–23	25–22		97–93	Report
13 Aug 2025	19:30	Spain	0–3	Switzerland	17–25	16–25	20–25			53–75	Report
16 Aug 2025	17:00	Switzerland	3–2	Sweden	21–25	22–25	26–24	25–17	15–9	109–100	Report

=== Pool F ===
Pos	Team	Pld	W	L	Pts	SW	SL	SR	SPW	SPL	SPR	Qualification
1	Greece	4	4	0	12	12	1	12.000	317	223	1.422	2026 European Championship
2	North Macedonia	4	2	2	6	7	6	1.167	294	257	1.144	2026 European Championship
3	Georgia	4	0	4	0	0	12	0.000	169	300	0.563	

Source: CEV

Date	Time		Score		Set 1	Set 2	Set 3	Set 4	Set 5	Total	Report
17 Aug 2024	16:00	Georgia	0–3	North Macedonia	12–25	14–25	18–25			44–75	Report
25 Aug 2024	20:15	North Macedonia	1–3	Greece	25–15	18–25	23–25	20–25		86–90	Report
29 Aug 2024	20:30	Greece	3–0	Georgia	25–14	25–8	25–16			75–38	Report
9 Aug 2025	19:00	Georgia	0–3	Greece	16–25	10–25	15–25			41–75	Report
13 Aug 2025	20:00	Greece	3–0	North Macedonia	25–18	25–15	27–25			77–58	Report
17 Aug 2025	20:00	North Macedonia	3–0	Georgia	25–13	25–16	25–17			75–46	Report

=== Pool G ===
Pos	Team	Pld	W	L	Pts	SW	SL	SR	SPW	SPL	SPR	Qualification
1	Slovakia	4	3	1	9	10	4	2.500	337	271	1.244	2026 European Championship
2	Latvia	4	3	1	9	10	5	2.000	353	303	1.165	2026 European Championship
3	Kosovo	4	0	4	0	1	12	0.083	207	323	0.641	

Source: CEV

Date	Time		Score		Set 1	Set 2	Set 3	Set 4	Set 5	Total	Report
17 Aug 2024	17:00	Kosovo	0–3	Latvia	14–25	19–25	17–25			50–75	Report
25 Aug 2024	17:15	Latvia	3–1	Slovakia	25–23	21–25	26–24	25–21		97–93	Report
28 Aug 2024	18:00	Slovakia	3–0	Kosovo	25–21	25–14	25–9			75–44	Report
9 Aug 2025	20:30	Kosovo	0–3	Slovakia	20–25	14–25	13–25			47–75	Report
13 Aug 2025	19:00	Slovakia	3–1	Latvia	18–25	26–24	25–15	25–19		94–83	Report
16 Aug 2025	19:30	Latvia	3–1	Kosovo	25–13	25–12	23–25	25–16		98–66	Report

=== Ranking of the second-placed teams ===
- The top five of the second-placed teams will qualify for the 2026 European Championship.

Pos	Pool	Team	Pld	W	L	Pts	SW	SL	SR	SPW	SPL	SPR	Qualification
1	G	Latvia	4	3	1	9	10	5	2.000	353	303	1.165	2026 European Championship
2	A	Turkey	4	3	1	8	9	5	1.800	326	253	1.289	2026 European Championship
3	D	Israel	4	3	1	7	10	8	1.250	404	397	1.018	2026 European Championship
4	E	Sweden	4	2	2	8	10	7	1.429	373	362	1.030	2026 European Championship
5	F	North Macedonia	4	2	2	6	7	6	1.167	294	257	1.144	2026 European Championship
6	B	Austria	4	2	2	6	7	6	1.167	285	271	1.052	
7	C	Norway	4	1	3	3	5	9	0.556	303	334	0.907	

== See also ==
- 2026 Women's European Volleyball Championship qualification
