= 2021 Men's European Volleyball Championship qualification =

This article describes the qualification for the 2021 Men's European Volleyball Championship.

Poland, Czech Republic, Estonia and Finland as host countries were directly qualified. The eight best placed teams at the 2019 edition also gained direct entries into the tournament. 26 teams had registered for participation but Denmark later withdrew due to restrictions in response to the COVID-19 pandemic. So, 25 teams competed for the remaining 12 places at the final tournament.

== Qualified teams ==
Means of qualification	Qualifier	Means of qualification		Qualifier
Host Countries	Poland	Qualification	Pool A	Netherlands
Host Countries	Czech Republic	Qualification	Pool B	Bulgaria
Host Countries	Estonia	Qualification	Pool C	Turkey
Host Countries	Finland	Qualification	Pool D	Latvia
2019 European Championship	Serbia	Qualification	Pool E	Slovakia
2019 European Championship	Slovenia	Qualification	Pool F	Montenegro
2019 European Championship	France	Qualification	Pool G	Portugal
2019 European Championship	Russia	Qualification	Best runners-up	North Macedonia
2019 European Championship	Italy	Qualification	Best runners-up	Spain
2019 European Championship	Ukraine	Qualification	Best runners-up	Greece
2019 European Championship	Germany	Qualification	Best runners-up	Croatia
2019 European Championship	Belgium	Qualification	Best runners-up	Belarus
Total 24

== Direct qualification ==
- 2019 Men's European Volleyball Championship final standing

Rank	Team
1st place, gold medalist(s)	Serbia
2nd place, silver medalist(s)	Slovenia
3rd place, bronze medalist(s)	Poland
4	France
5	Russia
6	Italy
7	Ukraine
8	Germany
9	Belgium
10	Netherlands
11	Bulgaria
12	Turkey
13	Czech Republic
14	Finland
15	Spain
16	Greece
17	North Macedonia
18	Montenegro
19	Slovakia
20	Portugal
21	Romania
22	Belarus
23	Austria
24	Estonia

Qualified for the 2021 European Championship
Qualified as hosts for the 2021 European Championship

== Format ==
There being seven pools of either three or four teams each, the winners of each pool and the 5 best runners-up qualified for the 2021 European Championship. The pools were played in a double round-robin tournaments format officially from 30 August 2020 to 16 May 2021, according to the CEV web site. Since there was a different number of teams across the seven pools, the results of the matches played with the teams finishing last in the pools of four were discarded in order to determine the five best runners-up across all pools.

== Pools composition ==
Teams were seeded following the serpentine system according to their CEV European Ranking as of 1 January 2020. But, Denmark withdrew after the draw. Rankings are shown in brackets.

Pool A	Pool B	Pool C	Pool D
Netherlands (8)	Bulgaria (10)	Turkey (11)	Spain (14)
Sweden (26)	Austria (25)	North Macedonia (24)	Latvia (23)
Croatia (27)	Israel (28)	~~Denmark (29)~~	Moldova (30)
		Bosnia and Herzegovina (47)	Cyprus (41)

Pool E	Pool F	Pool G
Slovakia (17)	Greece (18)	Belarus (19)
Romania (22)	Montenegro (21)	Portugal (20)
Switzerland (30)	Azerbaijan (32)	Norway (33)
Albania (39)	Georgia (36)	Hungary (34)

== Pool standing procedure ==
1. Number of matches won
2. Match points
3. Sets ratio
4. Points ratio
5. If the tie continues as per the point ratio between two teams, the priority will be given to the team which won the last match between them. When the tie in points ratio is between three or more teams, a new classification of these teams in the terms of points 1, 2 and 3 will be made taking into consideration only the matches in which they were opposed to each other.

Match won 3–0 or 3–1: 3 match points for the winner, 0 match points for the loser
Match won 3–2: 2 match points for the winner, 1 match point for the loser

== Results ==
- The winners in each pool and the top five of the second ranked teams qualified for the 2021 European Championship.

=== Pool A ===
- Dates: 7–16 May 2021
- All times are Central European Summer Time (UTC+02:00).

Pos	Team	Pld	W	L	Pts	SW	SL	SR	SPW	SPL	SPR	Qualification
1	Netherlands	4	3	1	10	11	5	2.200	382	334	1.144	2021 European Championship
2	Croatia	4	3	1	7	10	8	1.250	407	399	1.020	2021 European Championship
3	Sweden	4	0	4	1	4	12	0.333	315	371	0.849	

==== Tournament 1 ====
- Venue: Krešimir Ćosić Hall, Zadar, Croatia

Date	Time		Score		Set 1	Set 2	Set 3	Set 4	Set 5	Total	Report
7 May	18:30	Croatia	1–3	Netherlands	30–32	25–19	23–25	18–25		96–101	Report
8 May	18:30	Netherlands	3–0	Sweden	25–17	25–17	25–15			75–49	Report
9 May	18:30	Sweden	1–3	Croatia	18–25	20–25	25–22	19–25		82–97	Report

==== Tournament 2 ====
- Venue: Omnisport Apeldoorn Volleyball Hall, Apeldoorn, Netherlands

Date	Time		Score		Set 1	Set 2	Set 3	Set 4	Set 5	Total	Report
14 May	19:30	Sweden	1–3	Netherlands	17–25	21–25	25–19	17–25		80–94	Report
15 May	16:00	Croatia	3–2	Sweden	25–21	25–22	19–25	21–25	15–11	105–104	Report
16 May	16:00	Netherlands	2–3	Croatia	25–27	23–25	25–18	26–24	13–15	112–109	Report

=== Pool B ===
- Venue: Enerbox Sport Palace, Hadera, Israel
- Dates: 12–17 January 2021
- All times are Israel Standard Time (UTC+02:00).

Pos	Team	Pld	W	L	Pts	SW	SL	SR	SPW	SPL	SPR	Qualification
1	Bulgaria	4	4	0	12	12	1	12.000	322	269	1.197	2021 European Championship
2	Austria	4	1	3	4	6	9	0.667	326	345	0.945	
3	Israel	4	1	3	2	3	11	0.273	302	336	0.899	

==== Tournament 1 ====
Date	Time		Score		Set 1	Set 2	Set 3	Set 4	Set 5	Total	Report
12 Jan	20:00	Israel	0–3	Austria	25–27	23–25	20–25			68–77	Report
13 Jan	18:00	Austria	1–3	Bulgaria	21–25	25–20	19–25	22–25		87–95	Report
14 Jan	19:00	Bulgaria	3–0	Israel	27–25	25–16	25–22			77–63	Report

==== Tournament 2 ====
Date	Time		Score		Set 1	Set 2	Set 3	Set 4	Set 5	Total	Report
15 Jan	17:00	Austria	2–3	Israel	21–25	25–20	25–27	25–20	11–15	107–107	Report
16 Jan	21:00	Bulgaria	3–0	Austria	25–15	25–18	25–22			75–55	Report
17 Jan	20:00	Israel	0–3	Bulgaria	20–25	21–25	23–25			64–75	Report

=== Pool C ===
- Venue: Boris Trajkovski Sports Center, Skopje, North Macedonia
- Dates: 11–16 January 2021
- All times are Central European Time (UTC+01:00).

Pos	Team	Pld	W	L	Pts	SW	SL	SR	SPW	SPL	SPR	Qualification
1	Turkey	4	3	1	9	10	4	2.500	328	263	1.247	2021 European Championship
2	North Macedonia	4	3	1	9	10	5	2.000	343	325	1.055	2021 European Championship
3	Bosnia and Herzegovina	4	0	4	0	1	12	0.083	243	326	0.745	

==== Tournament 1 ====
Date	Time		Score		Set 1	Set 2	Set 3	Set 4	Set 5	Total	Report
11 Jan	18:00	North Macedonia	3–1	Bosnia and Herzegovina	27–25	25–21	23–25	25–19		100–90	Report
12 Jan	18:00	Bosnia and Herzegovina	0–3	Turkey	15–25	17–25	18–25			50–75	Report
13 Jan	18:00	Turkey	3–1	North Macedonia	25–16	18–25	25–18	25–12		93–71	Report

==== Tournament 2 ====
Date	Time		Score		Set 1	Set 2	Set 3	Set 4	Set 5	Total	Report
14 Jan	18:00	Bosnia and Herzegovina	0–3	North Macedonia	20–25	24–26	13–25			57–76	Report
15 Jan	18:00	Turkey	3–0	Bosnia and Herzegovina	25–9	25–19	25–18			75–46	Report
16 Jan	18:00	North Macedonia	3–1	Turkey	25–19	21–25	25–23	25–18		96–85	Report

=== Pool D ===
- Venue: Eleftheria Indoor Hall, Nicosia, Cyprus
- Dates: 30 August – 6 September 2020
- All times are Eastern European Summer Time (UTC+03:00).

Pos	Team	Pld	W	L	Pts	SW	SL	SR	SPW	SPL	SPR	Qualification
1	Latvia	6	4	2	12	14	6	2.333	485	404	1.200	2021 European Championship
2	Spain	6	4	2	12	13	9	1.444	519	507	1.024	2021 European Championship
3	Moldova	6	2	4	7	8	13	0.615	451	479	0.942	
4	Cyprus	6	2	4	5	7	14	0.500	432	497	0.869	

==== Tournament 1 ====
Date	Time		Score		Set 1	Set 2	Set 3	Set 4	Set 5	Total	Report
30 Aug	17:00	Moldova	0–3	Latvia	10–25	21–25	20–25			51–75	Report
30 Aug	20:00	Cyprus	1–3	Spain	22–25	27–25	17–25	17–25		83–100	Report
31 Aug	17:00	Latvia	1–3	Spain	22–25	21–25	25–16	19–25		87–91	Report
31 Aug	20:00	Moldova	3–0	Cyprus	25–22	25–22	25–22			75–66	Report
1 Sep	17:00	Spain	1–3	Moldova	25–23	20–25	21–25	19–25		85–98	Report
1 Sep	20:00	Latvia	3–0	Cyprus	25–17	25–16	25–11			75–44	Report

==== Tournament 2 ====
Date	Time		Score		Set 1	Set 2	Set 3	Set 4	Set 5	Total	Report
4 Sep	17:00	Moldova	0–3	Latvia	22–25	17–25	22–25			61–75	Report
4 Sep	20:00	Cyprus	3–0	Spain	27–25	25–22	25–23			77–70	Report
5 Sep	17:00	Latvia	1–3	Spain	25–27	25–18	26–28	22–25		98–98	Report
5 Sep	20:00	Moldova	2–3	Cyprus	20–25	25–19	25–19	22–25	10–15	102–103	Report
6 Sep	17:00	Spain	3–0	Moldova	25–19	25–22	25–23			75–64	Report
6 Sep	20:00	Latvia	3–0	Cyprus	25–15	25–21	25–23			75–59	Report

=== Pool E ===
- Dates: 6–16 May 2021

Pos	Team	Pld	W	L	Pts	SW	SL	SR	SPW	SPL	SPR	Qualification
1	Slovakia	6	5	1	15	16	7	2.286	535	492	1.087	2021 European Championship
2	Switzerland	6	4	2	11	13	10	1.300	534	498	1.072	
3	Romania	6	3	3	10	13	11	1.182	536	507	1.057	
4	Albania	6	0	6	0	4	18	0.222	438	546	0.802	

==== Tournament 1 ====
- Venue: Nitra City Hall, Nitra, Slovakia
- All times are Central European Summer Time (UTC+02:00).

Date	Time		Score		Set 1	Set 2	Set 3	Set 4	Set 5	Total	Report
6 May	16:00	Slovakia	3–0	Switzerland	25–22	25–21	25–23			75–66	Report
6 May	19:00	Romania	3–0	Albania	25–15	25–19	25–18			75–52	Report
7 May	17:00	Slovakia	3–1	Romania	25–21	25–21	14–25	25–22		89–89	Report
7 May	20:00	Switzerland	3–0	Albania	25–18	25–21	26–24			76–63	Report
8 May	17:30	Switzerland	3–1	Romania	21–25	25–18	25–19	25–20		96–82	Report
8 May	20:30	Albania	1–3	Slovakia	20–25	13–25	25–21	19–25		77–96	Report

==== Tournament 2 ====
- Venue: Olimpia Sports Hall, Ploiești, Romania
- All times are Eastern European Summer Time (UTC+03:00).

Date	Time		Score		Set 1	Set 2	Set 3	Set 4	Set 5	Total	Report
14 May	17:00	Albania	1–3	Romania	26–24	22–25	13–25	21–25		82–99	Report
14 May	20:00	Slovakia	3–1	Switzerland	19–25	25–21	25–22	25–21		94–89	Report
15 May	17:00	Romania	2–3	Switzerland	25–21	21–25	25–21	22–25	7–15	100–107	Report
15 May	20:00	Albania	1–3	Slovakia	16–25	19–25	27–25	18–25		80–100	Report
16 May	17:00	Romania	3–1	Slovakia	25–19	16–25	25–22	25–15		91–81	Report
16 May	20:00	Switzerland	3–1	Albania	25–27	25–15	25–19	25–23		100–84	Report

=== Pool F ===
- Dates: 7–16 May 2021

Pos	Team	Pld	W	L	Pts	SW	SL	SR	SPW	SPL	SPR	Qualification
1	Montenegro	6	5	1	16	17	5	3.400	520	407	1.278	2021 European Championship
2	Greece	6	5	1	14	15	5	3.000	465	356	1.306	2021 European Championship
3	Azerbaijan	6	2	4	6	8	12	0.667	415	446	0.930	
4	Georgia	6	0	6	0	0	18	0.000	259	450	0.576	

==== Tournament 1 ====
- Venue: Tbilisi New Volleyball Arena, Tbilisi, Georgia
- All times are Georgia Time (UTC+04:00).

Date	Time		Score		Set 1	Set 2	Set 3	Set 4	Set 5	Total	Report
7 May	15:30	Azerbaijan	1–3	Montenegro	23–25	21–25	25–21	15–25		84–96	Report
7 May	18:30	Georgia	0–3	Greece	12–25	14–25	12–25			38–75	Report
8 May	15:30	Montenegro	2–3	Greece	25–17	20–25	19–25	25–23	14–16	103–106	Report
8 May	18:30	Azerbaijan	3–0	Georgia	25–20	25–22	25–15			75–57	Report
9 May	15:30	Greece	3–0	Azerbaijan	25–21	25–19	25–18			75–58	Report
9 May	18:30	Montenegro	3–0	Georgia	25–8	25–12	25–11			75–31	Report

==== Tournament 2 ====
- Venue: SC Verde Hall, Podgorica, Montenegro
- All times are Central European Summer Time (UTC+02:00).

Date	Time		Score		Set 1	Set 2	Set 3	Set 4	Set 5	Total	Report
14 May	17:00	Georgia	0–3	Greece	10–25	10–25	16–25			36–75	Report
14 May	20:00	Montenegro	3–1	Azerbaijan	25–16	25–12	20–25	26–24		96–77	Report
15 May	17:00	Greece	3–0	Azerbaijan	25–16	25–17	25–13			75–46	Report
15 May	20:00	Georgia	0–3	Montenegro	14–25	20–25	16–25			50–75	Report
16 May	17:00	Azerbaijan	3–0	Georgia	25–13	25–17	25–17			75–47	Report
16 May	20:00	Greece	0–3	Montenegro	15–25	21–25	23–25			59–75	Report

=== Pool G ===
- Dates: 7–16 May 2021

Pos	Team	Pld	W	L	Pts	SW	SL	SR	SPW	SPL	SPR	Qualification
1	Portugal	6	6	0	17	18	3	6.000	505	423	1.194	2021 European Championship
2	Belarus	6	4	2	13	15	7	2.143	512	440	1.164	2021 European Championship
3	Hungary	6	1	5	3	5	16	0.313	436	507	0.860	
4	Norway	6	1	5	3	4	16	0.250	404	487	0.830	

==== Tournament 1 ====
- Venue: Ludovika Aréna, Budapest, Hungary
- All times are Central European Summer Time (UTC+02:00).

Date	Time		Score		Set 1	Set 2	Set 3	Set 4	Set 5	Total	Report
7 May	16:00	Belarus	2–3	Portugal	25–21	23–25	25–23	23–25	10–15	106–109	Report
7 May	19:00	Hungary	3–1	Norway	23–25	25–22	25–23	25–21		98–91	Report
8 May	16:00	Portugal	3–0	Norway	25–18	25–21	25–19			75–58	Report
8 May	19:00	Belarus	3–0	Hungary	25–21	25–15	25–12			75–48	Report
9 May	16:00	Norway	0–3	Belarus	21–25	14–25	22–25			57–75	Report
9 May	19:00	Portugal	3–0	Hungary	25–21	25–16	25–21			75–58	Report

==== Tournament 2 ====
- Venue: Centro de Desportos e Congressos de Matosinhos, Matosinhos, Portugal
- All times are Western European Summer Time (UTC+01:00).

Date	Time		Score		Set 1	Set 2	Set 3	Set 4	Set 5	Total	Report
14 May	16:00	Norway	3–1	Hungary	21–25	26–24	25–18	25–22		97–89	Report
14 May	19:00	Portugal	3–1	Belarus	25–22	25–19	21–25	25–21		96–87	Report
15 May	15:00	Hungary	1–3	Belarus	23–25	25–19	20–25	18–25		86–94	Report
15 May	18:00	Norway	0–3	Portugal	17–25	18–25	22–25			57–75	Report
16 May	15:00	Belarus	3–0	Norway	25–19	25–15	25–10			75–44	Report
16 May	18:00	Hungary	0–3	Portugal	15–25	20–25	22–25			57–75	Report

=== Ranking of the second placed teams ===
- Matches against the fourth placed team in each pool were not included in this ranking.
- The top five of the second placed teams qualified for the 2021 European Championship.

Pos	Team	Pld	W	L	Pts	SW	SL	SR	SPW	SPL	SPR	Qualification
1	North Macedonia	4	3	1	9	10	5	2.000	343	325	1.055	2021 European Championship
2	Spain	4	3	1	9	10	5	2.000	349	347	1.006	2021 European Championship
3	Greece	4	3	1	8	9	5	1.800	315	282	1.117	2021 European Championship
4	Croatia	4	3	1	7	10	8	1.250	407	399	1.020	2021 European Championship
5	Belarus	4	2	2	7	9	7	1.286	362	339	1.068	2021 European Championship
6	Switzerland	4	2	2	5	7	9	0.778	358	351	1.020	
7	Austria	4	1	3	4	6	9	0.667	326	345	0.945	
