= 2015 Men's European Volleyball Championship qualification =

This is an article about qualification for the 2015 Men's European Volleyball Championship.

== Qualification summary ==
Qualified teams

- Hosts
  - Bulgaria
  - Italy
- Directly qualified after 2013 edition
  - Russia
  - Serbia
  - France
  - Germany
  - Belgium
- Qualified through qualification
  - Group A: Poland
  - Group B: Finland
  - Group C: Slovakia
  - Group D: Czech Republic
  - Group E: Croatia
  - Group F: Belarus
  - Play-off 1: Slovenia
  - Play-off 2: Estonia
  - Play-off 3: Netherlands

== First round ==
First round was held 9–18 May 2014. 12 teams competed in three First Round tournaments consisting of 4 teams. The three 1st placed teams and the two 2nd placed teams with the best score qualified for the Second Round.

Group A	Group B	Group C
Host : Luxembourg Moldova; Israel; Luxembourg; Lithuania	Host : Hungary Hungary; Norway; Switzerland; Bosnia and Herzegovina	Host : Macedonia Macedonia; Sweden; Azerbaijan; Georgia

All times are local.

=== Pool A ===
The tournament was held at d'Coque in Luxembourg, Luxembourg.

Pos	Team	Pld	W	L	Pts	SW	SL	SR	SPW	SPL	SPR	Qualification
1	Moldova	3	3	0	8	9	2	4.500	257	212	1.212	Second round
2	Israel	3	2	1	6	6	3	2.000	212	178	1.191	Eliminated
3	Luxembourg	3	1	2	3	3	6	0.500	183	217	0.843	Eliminated
4	Lithuania	3	0	3	1	2	9	0.222	212	257	0.825	Eliminated

Date	Time		Score		Set 1	Set 2	Set 3	Set 4	Set 5	Total	Report
9 May	18:30	Moldova	3–0	Israel	25–22	25–21	25–19			75–62	Report
9 May	21:00	Luxembourg	3–0	Lithuania	25–23	25–21	25–23			75–67	Report
10 May	18:30	Israel	3–0	Lithuania	25–15	25–17	25–16			75–48	Report
10 May	21:00	Moldova	3–0	Luxembourg	25–18	25–22	25–13			75–53	Report
11 May	17:00	Lithuania	2–3	Moldova	20–25	25–22	18–25	25–20	9–15	97–107	Report
11 May	19:30	Israel	3–0	Luxembourg	25–21	25–20	25–14			75–55	Report

=== Pool B ===
The tournament was held at Messzi István Sportcsarnok in Kecskemét, Hungary.

Pos	Team	Pld	W	L	Pts	SW	SL	SR	SPW	SPL	SPR	Qualification
1	Norway	3	3	0	8	9	4	2.250	297	254	1.169	Second round
2	Hungary	3	2	1	7	8	3	2.667	247	212	1.165	Second round
3	Switzerland	3	1	2	2	4	8	0.500	244	279	0.875	Eliminated
4	Bosnia and Herzegovina	3	0	3	1	3	9	0.333	233	276	0.844	Eliminated

Date	Time		Score		Set 1	Set 2	Set 3	Set 4	Set 5	Total	Report
9 May	16:30	Bosnia and Herzegovina	1–3	Norway	19–25	25–18	15–25	18–25		77–93	Report
9 May	19:00	Hungary	3–0	Switzerland	25–23	25–12	25–21			75–56	Report
10 May	15:00	Norway	3–1	Switzerland	24–26	25–23	25–14	25–17		99–80	Report
10 May	17:30	Bosnia and Herzegovina	0–3	Hungary	17–25	18–25	16–25			51–75	Report
11 May	16:00	Switzerland	3–2	Bosnia and Herzegovina	25–22	19–25	23–25	25–19	16–14	108–105	Report
11 May	18:30	Norway	3–2	Hungary	25–22	18–25	25–14	22–25	15–11	105–97	Report

=== Pool C ===
The tournament was held at the Sportska sala "Park" in Strumica, Macedonia.

Pos	Team	Pld	W	L	Pts	SW	SL	SR	SPW	SPL	SPR	Qualification
1	Macedonia	3	3	0	9	9	1	9.000	254	181	1.403	Second round
2	Sweden	3	2	1	6	7	3	2.333	245	193	1.269	Second round
3	Azerbaijan	3	1	2	3	3	6	0.500	170	203	0.837	Eliminated
4	Georgia	3	0	3	0	0	9	0.000	133	225	0.591	Eliminated

Date	Time		Score		Set 1	Set 2	Set 3	Set 4	Set 5	Total	Report
9 May	16:30	Georgia	0–3	Sweden	19–25	9–25	13–25			41–75	Report
9 May	19:00	Macedonia	3–0	Azerbaijan	25–15	25–17	25–15			75–47	Report
10 May	16:30	Sweden	3–0	Azerbaijan	25–16	25–15	25–17			75–48	Report
10 May	19:00	Georgia	0–3	Macedonia	13–25	12–25	14–25			39–75	Report
11 May	16:30	Azerbaijan	3–0	Georgia	25–21	25–12	25–20			75–53	Report
11 May	19:00	Sweden	1–3	Macedonia	29–31	25–23	19–25	22–25		95–104	Report

== Second round ==
24 teams competed in the Second Round, where each pool of 4 teams played in 2 tournaments in May–June 2014 (the last competition day must be on a Saturday or a Sunday). The 1st placed teams of each pool qualify directly for the 2015 Championship. The 2nd placed teams of each pool qualify for the Third Round.

=== Group A ===
The tournament was held at the Centennial Hall in Wrocław, Poland and Arena Stožice in Ljubljana, Slovenia.

Pos	Team	Pld	W	L	Pts	SW	SL	SR	SPW	SPL	SPR	Qualification
1	Poland	6	5	1	16	17	3	5.667	510	409	1.247	Qualified to European Championship
2	Slovenia	6	5	1	11	16	11	1.455	602	571	1.054	Third round
3	Macedonia	6	1	5	5	8	15	0.533	464	522	0.889	Eliminated
4	Latvia	6	1	5	4	5	16	0.313	446	520	0.858	Eliminated

- Tournament 1 in Poland

Date	Time		Score		Set 1	Set 2	Set 3	Set 4	Set 5	Total	Report
16 May	16:00	Macedonia	2–3	Slovenia	18–25	25–18	25–19	16–25	8–15	92–102	Report
16 May	18:30	Poland	3–0	Latvia	25–15	25–23	25–16			75–54	Report
17 May	16:00	Slovenia	3–2	Latvia	38–40	25–18	23–25	25–18	15–10	126–111	Report
17 May	19:00	Macedonia	0–3	Poland	13–25	15–25	15–25			43–75	Report
18 May	16:00	Latvia	3–1	Macedonia	25–17	25–19	24–26	28–26		102–88	Report
18 May	19:00	Slovenia	1–3	Poland	15–25	24–26	25–23	20–25		84–99	Report

- Tournament 2 in Slovenia

Date	Time		Score		Set 1	Set 2	Set 3	Set 4	Set 5	Total	Report
23 May	17:00	Poland	2–3	Slovenia	25–20	26–24	25–27	24–26	11–15	111–112	Report
23 May	20:00	Latvia	0–3	Macedonia	29–31	19–25	17–25			65–81	Report
24 May	16:00	Slovenia	3–2	Macedonia	24–26	25–20	14–25	25–20	15–10	103–101	Report
24 May	19:00	Poland	3–0	Latvia	25–22	25–17	25–18			75–57	Report
25 May	16:00	Macedonia	0–3	Poland	19–25	19–25	21–25			59–75	Report
25 May	19:00	Slovenia	3–0	Latvia	25–18	25–19	25–20			75–57	Report

=== Group B ===
The tournament was held at the Pavilhão De Desportos De Vila Do Conde in Vila do Conde, Portugal, and Energia Areena in Vantaa, Finland.

Pos	Team	Pld	W	L	Pts	SW	SL	SR	SPW	SPL	SPR	Qualification
1	Finland	6	6	0	16	18	8	2.250	613	515	1.190	Qualified to European Championship
2	Portugal	6	4	2	13	15	7	2.143	494	469	1.053	Third round
3	Moldova	6	2	4	7	10	13	0.769	499	515	0.969	Eliminated
4	Austria	6	0	6	0	3	18	0.167	405	512	0.791	Eliminated

- Tournament 1 in Portugal

Date	Time		Score		Set 1	Set 2	Set 3	Set 4	Set 5	Total	Report
16 May	19:00	Finland	3–2	Moldova	25–17	24–26	25–23	23–25	15–8	112–99	Report
16 May	22:00	Portugal	3–0	Austria	25–21	25–17	25–20			75–58	Report
17 May	18:00	Moldova	0–3	Portugal	20–25	16–25	16–25			52–75	Report
17 May	18:30	Finland	3–1	Austria	25–21	25–17	22–25	25–18		97–81	Report
18 May	17:00	Portugal	2–3	Finland	25–20	23–25	25–23	15–25	11–15	99–108	Report
18 May	17:30	Austria	1–3	Moldova	22–25	25–21	14–25	16–25		77–96	Report

- Tournament 2 in Finland

Date	Time		Score		Set 1	Set 2	Set 3	Set 4	Set 5	Total	Report
23 May	16:00	Austria	0–3	Portugal	21–25	21–25	15–25			57–75	Report
23 May	19:00	Finland	3–1	Moldova	21–25	25–11	25–22	29–27		100–85	Report
24 May	15:00	Portugal	3–1	Moldova	27–25	23–25	25–21	25–21		100–92	Report
24 May	18:00	Austria	1–3	Finland	20–25	25–19	17–25	19–25		81–94	Report
25 May	14:00	Moldova	3–0	Austria	25–12	25–17	25–22			75–51	Report
25 May	17:00	Portugal	1–3	Finland	20–25	29–27	12–25	20–25		81–102	Report

=== Group C ===
The tournament was held at the Aréna Poprad in Poprad, Slovakia and Melina Merkouri Indoor Hall in Rentis, Greece.

Pos	Team	Pld	W	L	Pts	SW	SL	SR	SPW	SPL	SPR	Qualification
1	Slovakia	6	5	1	15	15	4	3.750	456	391	1.166	Qualified to European Championship
2	Estonia	6	4	2	12	12	9	1.333	489	470	1.040	Third round
3	Greece	6	3	3	9	10	10	1.000	466	456	1.022	Eliminated
4	Hungary	6	0	6	0	4	18	0.222	446	540	0.826	Eliminated

- Tournament 1 in Slovakia

Date	Time		Score		Set 1	Set 2	Set 3	Set 4	Set 5	Total	Report
23 May	16:30	Estonia	3–0	Greece	26–24	25–21	27–25			78–70	Report
23 May	19:00	Slovakia	3–0	Hungary	25–21	25–21	25–11			75–53	Report
24 May	16:30	Greece	3–1	Hungary	25–22	25–17	22–25	25–20		97–84	Report
24 May	19:00	Estonia	0–3	Slovakia	18–25	22–25	15–25			55–75	Report
25 May	16:30	Hungary	1–3	Estonia	22–25	25–22	18–25	21–25		86–97	Report
25 May	19:00	Greece	3–0	Slovakia	25–18	25–21	25–23			75–62	Report

- Tournament 2 in Greece

Date	Time		Score		Set 1	Set 2	Set 3	Set 4	Set 5	Total	Report
29 May	17:00	Estonia	0–3	Slovakia	18–25	23–25	18–25			59–75	Report
29 May	19:30	Greece	3–0	Hungary	25–21	25–22	25–16			75–59	Report
30 May	17:00	Slovakia	3–1	Hungary	26–24	25–17	18–25	25–17		94–83	Report
30 May	19:30	Estonia	3–1	Greece	25–18	23–25	25–23	25–17		98–83	Report
31 May	18:00	Hungary	1–3	Estonia	29–27	17–25	19–25	16–25		81–102	Report
31 May	20:00	Slovakia	3–0	Greece	25–22	25–21	25–23			75–66	Report

=== Group D ===
The tournament was held at the City Hall in Jablonec nad Nisou, Czech Republic and Polideportivo Príncipes de Asturias in Pinto, Spain.

Pos	Team	Pld	W	L	Pts	SW	SL	SR	SPW	SPL	SPR	Qualification
1	Czech Republic	6	5	1	16	17	5	3.400	520	448	1.161	Qualified to European Championship
2	Spain	6	4	2	12	13	10	1.300	529	511	1.035	Third round
3	Ukraine	6	3	3	8	12	13	0.923	581	581	1.000	Eliminated
4	Norway	6	0	6	0	4	18	0.222	452	542	0.834	Eliminated

- Tournament 1 in Czech Republic

Date	Time		Score		Set 1	Set 2	Set 3	Set 4	Set 5	Total	Report
16 May	16:00	Spain	3–1	Ukraine	31–29	26–24	18–25	26–24		101–102	Report
16 May	19:00	Czech Republic	3–0	Norway	25–20	25–20	25–13			75–53	Report
17 May	16:00	Ukraine	3–1	Norway	25–23	28–26	23–25	25–22		101–96	Report
17 May	19:00	Spain	0–3	Czech Republic	16–25	21–25	22–25			59–75	Report
18 May	16:00	Norway	1–3	Spain	15–25	18–25	25–20	17–25		75–95	Report
18 May	19:00	Ukraine	1–3	Czech Republic	19–25	21–25	25–22	23–25		88–97	Report

- Tournament 2 in Spain

Date	Time		Score		Set 1	Set 2	Set 3	Set 4	Set 5	Total	Report
22 May	18:00	Ukraine	3–2	Czech Republic	25–23	20–25	20–25	25–21	15–13	105–107	Report
22 May	20:30	Spain	3–1	Norway	25–21	25–20	21–25	25–17		96–83	Report
23 May	17:00	Czech Republic	3–0	Norway	26–24	25–12	25–22			76–58	Report
23 May	19:30	Ukraine	1–3	Spain	21–25	25–18	17–25	23–25		86–93	Report
24 May	15:00	Norway	1–3	Ukraine	26–24	20–25	22–25	19–25		87–99	Report
24 May	17:30	Czech Republic	3–1	Spain	25–14	25–23	15–25	25–23		90–85	Report

=== Group E ===
The tournament was held at the Morača Sports Center in Podgorica, Montenegro and Dom odbojke - Bojan Stranić in Zagreb, Croatia.

Pos	Team	Pld	W	L	Pts	SW	SL	SR	SPW	SPL	SPR	Qualification
1	Croatia	6	4	2	12	14	10	1.400	549	533	1.030	Qualified to European Championship
2	Netherlands	6	3	3	10	11	10	1.100	474	468	1.013	Third round
3	Montenegro	6	3	3	7	13	15	0.867	613	632	0.970	Eliminated
4	Romania	6	2	4	7	11	14	0.786	547	550	0.995	Eliminated

- Tournament 1 in Montenegro

Date	Time		Score		Set 1	Set 2	Set 3	Set 4	Set 5	Total	Report
16 May	16:30	Croatia	3–0	Netherlands	25–17	25–20	25–23			75–60	Report
16 May	19:00	Montenegro	2–3	Romania	14–25	22–25	25–22	25–21	11–15	97–108	Report
17 May	16:30	Netherlands	3–0	Romania	27–25	25–23	25–18			77–66	Report
17 May	19:00	Croatia	3–1	Montenegro	25–23	27–25	31–33	25–18		108–99	Report
18 May	16:30	Romania	1–3	Croatia	25–22	24–26	20–25	16–25		85–98	Report
18 May	19:00	Netherlands	2–3	Montenegro	25–19	16–25	25–23	23–25	10–15	99–107	Report

- Tournament 2 in Croatia

Date	Time		Score		Set 1	Set 2	Set 3	Set 4	Set 5	Total	Report
23 May	17:00	Romania	2–3	Croatia	22–25	22–25	25–23	25–19	7–15	101–107	Report
23 May	19:30	Netherlands	3–1	Montenegro	25–19	25–23	26–28	25–18		101–88	Report
24 May	17:00	Croatia	2–3	Montenegro	23–25	25–23	24–26	25–23	8–15	105–112	Report
24 May	19:30	Romania	3–0	Netherlands	26–24	25–22	25–15			76–61	Report
25 May	16:00	Montenegro	3–2	Romania	25–23	19–25	27–25	24–26	15–12	110–111	Report
25 May	18:30	Croatia	0–3	Netherlands	19–25	24–26	13–25			56–76	Report

=== Group F ===
The tournament was held at the Antvorskovhallen in Slagelse, Denmark, and Chizhovka-Arena Team Sports Hall in Minsk, Belarus.

Pos	Team	Pld	W	L	Pts	SW	SL	SR	SPW	SPL	SPR	Qualification
1	Belarus	6	5	1	15	17	8	2.125	596	518	1.151	Qualified to European Championship
2	Sweden	6	3	3	10	14	11	1.273	541	549	0.985	Third round
3	Turkey	6	3	3	9	12	13	0.923	549	553	0.993	Eliminated
4	Denmark	6	1	5	2	6	17	0.353	476	542	0.878	Eliminated

- Tournament 1 in Denmark

Date	Time		Score		Set 1	Set 2	Set 3	Set 4	Set 5	Total	Report
22 May	18:00	Turkey	3–2	Belarus	31–29	26–24	16–25	22–25	15–11	110–114	Report
22 May	20:30	Denmark	3–2	Sweden	25–21	20–25	25–18	22–25	15–13	107–102	Report
23 May	17:00	Belarus	3–1	Sweden	25–22	19–25	25–14	25–12		94–73	Report
23 May	19:30	Turkey	3–1	Denmark	25–14	12–25	25–19	25–20		87–78	Report
24 May	15:00	Sweden	3–0	Turkey	28–26	25–16	25–20			78–62	Report
24 May	17:30	Belarus	3–1	Denmark	26–28	25–15	25–17	25–20		101–80	Report

- Tournament 2 in Belarus

Date	Time		Score		Set 1	Set 2	Set 3	Set 4	Set 5	Total	Report
30 May	16:30	Denmark	1–3	Turkey	25–22	22–25	17–25	25–27		89–99	Report
30 May	19:00	Belarus	3–2	Sweden	25–22	24–26	25–27	25–20	18–16	117–111	Report
31 May	16:30	Turkey	2–3	Sweden	22–25	23–25	25–15	25–19	13–15	108–99	Report
31 May	19:00	Denmark	0–3	Belarus	22–25	23–25	16–25			61–75	Report
1 June	15:00	Sweden	3–0	Denmark	28–26	25–18	25–17			78–61	Report
1 June	17:30	Turkey	1–3	Belarus	19–25	20–25	25–20	19-25		83–70	Report

== Third round ==
The 2nd placed teams of the Second Round will play one home and one away match to determine the 3 winners who will then subsequently be qualified through to the 2015 Championship. The third round matches were held on 23–24 and 30–31 May 2015.

Team 1	Agg.	Team 2	1st leg	2nd leg
Slovenia	4–2	Portugal	3–0	2–3
Estonia	6–0	Sweden	3–1	3–0
Spain	0–6	Netherlands	0–3	1–3

=== First leg ===
Date	Time		Score		Set 1	Set 2	Set 3	Set 4	Set 5	Total	Report
23 May	19:30	Spain	0–3	Netherlands	22–25	19–25	19–25			60–75	Report
24 May	16:00	Estonia	3–1	Sweden	20–25	26–24	28–26	25–23		99–98	Report
24 May	16:30	Slovenia	3–0	Portugal	31–29	25–20	25–17			81–66	Report

=== Second leg ===
Date	Time		Score		Set 1	Set 2	Set 3	Set 4	Set 5	Total	Report
31 May	15:00	Sweden	0–3	Estonia	26–28	22–25	9–25			57–78	Report
31 May	15:00	Portugal	3–2	Slovenia	20–25	25–22	25–19	23–25	15–12	108–103	Report
31 May	16:00	Netherlands	3–1	Spain	23–25	27–25	25–23	25–18		100–91	Report
