= 2019 Men's European Volleyball Championship qualification =

This article describes the qualification for the 2019 Men's European Volleyball Championship.

== Qualification ==
Belgium, France, Netherlands and Slovenia as host countries were directly qualified. The eight best placed teams at the 2017 edition also gained direct entries into the tournament. 26 teams had registered for participation and compete for the remaining 12 places at the final tournament. The 26 teams were divided into seven pools of three or four teams. The pool winners and the best five runners-up advanced to the final round.

Means of qualification	Qualifier	Means of qualification		Qualifier
Host Countries	France	Qualification	Pool A	Romania
Host Countries	Slovenia	Qualification	Pool B	Estonia
Host Countries	Belgium	Qualification	Pool C	Slovakia
Host Countries	Netherlands	Qualification	Pool D	Portugal
2017 European Championship	Russia	Qualification	Pool E	Belarus
2017 European Championship	Germany	Qualification	Pool F	Ukraine
2017 European Championship	Serbia	Qualification	Pool G	Greece
2017 European Championship	Italy	Qualification	Best runners-up	Spain
2017 European Championship	Bulgaria	Qualification	Best runners-up	Montenegro
2017 European Championship	Czech Republic	Qualification	Best runners-up	Finland
2017 European Championship	Poland	Qualification	Best runners-up	Austria
2017 European Championship	Turkey	Qualification	Best runners-up	North Macedonia
Total 24

== Direct qualification ==
2017 Men's European Volleyball Championship final standing

Rank	Team
1st place, gold medalist(s)	Russia
2nd place, silver medalist(s)	Germany
3rd place, bronze medalist(s)	Serbia
4	Belgium
5	Italy
6	Bulgaria
7	Czech Republic
8	Slovenia
9	France
10	Poland
11	Turkey
12	Finland
13	Estonia
14	Netherlands
15	Slovakia
16	Spain

Qualified for the 2019 European Championship
Qualified as hosts for the 2019 European Championship

== Format ==
There being seven pools of either three or four teams each, the winners of each pool and the 5 best runners-up will qualify for the 2019 EuroVolley. The pools will be played in a home and away round-robin format officially from 15 August 2018 to 9 January 2019, according to the CEV web site. In reality, the matches are scheduled for the second half of August 2018 and the first part of January 2019. Since there is a different number of teams across the seven pools, the results of the matches played with the teams finishing last in the pools of four will be discarded in order to determine the five best runners-up across all pools. The pools composition results from the latest European Ranking for men's and women's national teams – as of 4 September and 2 October 2017, respectively – with teams being placed across the pools according to the serpentine system.

== Pool standing procedure ==
1. Number of matches won
2. Match points
3. Sets ratio
4. Points ratio
5. If the tie continues as per the point ratio between two teams, the priority will be given to the team which won the last match between them. When the tie in points ratio is between three or more teams, a new classification of these teams in the terms of points 1, 2 and 3 will be made taking into consideration only the matches in which they were opposed to each other.

Match won 3–0 or 3–1: 3 match points for the winner, 0 match points for the loser
Match won 3–2: 2 match points for the winner, 1 match point for the loser

== Results ==
- All times are local.
- The winners in each pool and the top five of the second ranked teams qualified for the 2019 European Championship.

=== Pool A ===
Pos	Team	Pld	W	L	Pts	SW	SL	SR	SPW	SPL	SPR	Qualification
1	Romania	4	3	1	7	10	8	1.250	390	389	1.003	2019 European Championship
2	Finland	4	2	2	7	9	7	1.286	355	321	1.106	2019 European Championship
3	Denmark	4	1	3	4	6	10	0.600	329	357	0.922	

Date	Time		Score		Set 1	Set 2	Set 3	Set 4	Set 5	Total	Report
15 Aug	20:00	Romania	3–2	Denmark	21–25	25–20	24–26	25–22	15–11	110–104	Report
18 Aug	19:00	Denmark	1–3	Finland	19–25	25–17	21–25	17–25		82–92	Report
22 Aug	20:00	Finland	2–3	Romania	18–25	25–21	22–25	25–18	6–15	96–104	Report
26 Aug	18:00	Romania	3–1	Finland	26–24	25–22	20–25	25–21		96–92	Report
6 Jan	17:00	Finland	3–0	Denmark	25–13	25–13	25–20			75–46	Report
9 Jan	20:00	Denmark	3–1	Romania	22–25	25–15	25–21	25–19		97–80	Report

=== Pool B ===
Pos	Team	Pld	W	L	Pts	SW	SL	SR	SPW	SPL	SPR	Qualification
1	Estonia	4	4	0	12	12	2	6.000	351	274	1.281	2019 European Championship
2	Israel	4	1	3	3	5	9	0.556	316	344	0.919	
3	Latvia	4	1	3	3	4	10	0.400	300	349	0.860	

Date	Time		Score		Set 1	Set 2	Set 3	Set 4	Set 5	Total	Report
15 Aug	19:30	Israel	3–0	Latvia	25–23	29–27	25–13			79–63	Report
19 Aug	19:00	Latvia	1–3	Estonia	22–25	17–25	25–22	19–25		83–97	Report
22 Aug	19:00	Estonia	3–0	Israel	25–19	25–21	25–15			75–55	Report
26 Aug	20:00	Israel	1–3	Estonia	31–29	15–25	20–25	18–25		84–104	Report
6 Jan	19:00	Estonia	3–0	Latvia	25–20	25–11	25–21			75–52	Report
9 Jan	19:30	Latvia	3–1	Israel	28–26	24–26	25–23	25–23		102–98	Report

=== Pool C ===
Pos	Team	Pld	W	L	Pts	SW	SL	SR	SPW	SPL	SPR	Qualification
1	Slovakia	6	5	1	15	15	4	3.750	466	366	1.273	2019 European Championship
2	Montenegro	6	4	2	13	14	6	2.333	471	410	1.149	2019 European Championship
3	Moldova	6	3	3	8	10	11	0.909	439	442	0.993	
4	Iceland	6	0	6	0	0	18	0.000	297	450	0.660	

Date	Time		Score		Set 1	Set 2	Set 3	Set 4	Set 5	Total	Report
15 Aug	18:00	Slovakia	3–0	Iceland	25–7	25–15	25–17			75–39	Report
15 Aug	19:00	Moldova	3–2	Montenegro	24–26	19–25	25–22	25–19	15–12	108–104	Report
19 Aug	18:00	Iceland	0–3	Moldova	12–25	11–25	22–25			45–75	Report
19 Aug	20:15	Montenegro	3–0	Slovakia	26–24	25–19	28–26			79–69	Report
22 Aug	17:00	Montenegro	3–0	Iceland	25–15	25–20	25–15			75–50	Report
22 Aug	18:00	Slovakia	3–0	Moldova	25–15	25–21	25–16			75–52	Report
26 Aug	17:00	Moldova	1–3	Slovakia	14–25	25–22	20–25	18–25		77–97	Report
26 Aug	18:00	Iceland	0–3	Montenegro	20–25	20–25	21–25			61–75	Report
5 Jan	15:30	Slovakia	3–0	Montenegro	25–21	25–22	25–20			75–63	Report
6 Jan	17:00	Moldova	3–0	Iceland	25–17	25–18	25–11			75–46	Report
9 Jan	20:15	Montenegro	3–0	Moldova	25–18	25–21	25–13			75–52	Report
9 Jan	20:00	Iceland	0–3	Slovakia	18–25	18–25	20–25			56–75	Report

=== Pool D ===
Pos	Team	Pld	W	L	Pts	SW	SL	SR	SPW	SPL	SPR	Qualification
1	Portugal	6	5	1	15	16	5	3.200	515	427	1.206	2019 European Championship
2	Austria	6	4	2	13	14	9	1.556	528	526	1.004	2019 European Championship
3	Albania	6	2	4	5	8	15	0.533	477	527	0.905	
4	Croatia	6	1	5	3	7	16	0.438	490	530	0.925	

Date	Time		Score		Set 1	Set 2	Set 3	Set 4	Set 5	Total	Report
15 Aug	20:15	Austria	3–1	Croatia	21–25	25–21	26–24	25–22		97–92	Report
15 Aug	20:00	Portugal	3–0	Albania	25–21	25–20	25–15			75–56	Report
18 Aug	20:00	Croatia	0–3	Portugal	18–25	22–25	18–25			58–75	Report
19 Aug	20:00	Albania	3–2	Austria	27–29	27–25	25–13	20–25	15–8	114–100	Report
22 Aug	20:30	Croatia	3–1	Albania	25–15	25–21	19–25	25–14		94–75	Report
22 Aug	20:00	Portugal	3–0	Austria	25–20	25–23	25–17			75–60	Report
25 Aug	20:15	Austria	3–1	Portugal	26–24	21–25	25–23	26–24		98–96	Report
26 Aug	20:00	Albania	3–1	Croatia	25–14	25–20	20–25	25–20		95–79	Report
5 Jan	20:15	Austria	3–0	Albania	25–13	25–21	30–28			80–62	Report
6 Jan	16:00	Portugal	3–1	Croatia	25–15	19–25	26–24	25–16		95–80	Report
9 Jan	19:00	Albania	1–3	Portugal	26–24	19–25	15–25	15–25		75–99	Report
9 Jan	19:00	Croatia	1–3	Austria	22–25	25–18	20–25	20–25		87–93	Report

=== Pool E ===
Pos	Team	Pld	W	L	Pts	SW	SL	SR	SPW	SPL	SPR	Qualification
1	Belarus	6	5	1	14	15	6	2.500	502	410	1.224	2019 European Championship
2	Spain	6	4	2	14	16	7	2.286	526	442	1.190	2019 European Championship
3	Norway	6	3	3	8	11	11	1.000	492	476	1.034	
4	Georgia	6	0	6	0	0	18	0.000	258	450	0.573	

Date	Time		Score		Set 1	Set 2	Set 3	Set 4	Set 5	Total	Report
15 Aug	18:00	Belarus	3–1	Norway	25–17	28–26	18–25	28–26		99–94	Report
15 Aug	20:00	Spain	3–0	Georgia	25–9	25–12	25–6			75–27	Report
18 Aug	18:00	Norway	3–0	Georgia	25–20	25–19	25–13			75–52	Report
19 Aug	16:00	Belarus	3–2	Spain	25–14	22–25	25–20	22–25	15–11	109–95	Report
22 Aug	18:00	Belarus	3–0	Georgia	25–13	25–19	25–12			75–44	Report
22 Aug	20:30	Spain	3–1	Norway	25–22	19–25	25–22	25–19		94–88	Report
25 Aug	15:00	Norway	3–2	Spain	29–27	12–25	25–21	19–25	15–12	100–110	Report
25 Aug	19:30	Georgia	0–3	Belarus	13–25	13–25	14–25			40–75	Report
5 Jan	19:00	Georgia	0–3	Norway	10–25	18–25	18–25			46–75	Report
6 Jan	19:00	Spain	3–0	Belarus	26–24	25–21	26–24			77–69	Report
9 Jan	16:00	Georgia	0–3	Spain	10–25	21–25	18–25			49–75	Report
9 Jan	20:00	Norway	0–3	Belarus	19–25	18–25	23–25			60–75	Report

=== Pool F ===
Pos	Team	Pld	W	L	Pts	SW	SL	SR	SPW	SPL	SPR	Qualification
1	Ukraine	6	6	0	16	18	6	3.000	572	512	1.117	2019 European Championship
2	Macedonia	6	3	3	9	14	13	1.077	595	594	1.002	2019 European Championship
3	Switzerland	6	2	4	7	12	16	0.750	581	600	0.968	
4	Hungary	6	1	5	4	8	17	0.471	534	576	0.927	

Date	Time		Score		Set 1	Set 2	Set 3	Set 4	Set 5	Total	Report
15 Aug	17:45	Hungary	2–3	Macedonia	23–25	23–25	25–23	25–23	14–16	110–112	Report
15 Aug	19:00	Ukraine	3–0	Switzerland	25–16	25–16	25–20			75–52	Report
18 Aug	20:30	Macedonia	2–3	Ukraine	27–25	26–24	20–25	20–25	12–15	105–114	Report
19 Aug	18:30	Switzerland	2–3	Hungary	23–25	25–21	19–25	25–23	13–15	105–109	Report
22 Aug	19:00	Ukraine	3–0	Hungary	25–15	27–25	25–19			77–59	Report
22 Aug	20:30	Macedonia	2–3	Switzerland	25–21	21–25	23–25	25–19	12–15	106–105	Report
25 Aug	17:00	Switzerland	2–3	Macedonia	21–25	19–25	25–16	25–23	12–15	102–104	Report
25 Aug	18:30	Hungary	1–3	Ukraine	26–28	20–25	25–19	24–26		95–98	Report
5 Jan	15:00	Hungary	2–3	Switzerland	25–22	25–22	20–25	21–25	8–15	99–109	Report
5 Jan	20:00	Ukraine	3–1	Macedonia	25–19	28–26	23–25	25–23		101–93	Report
9 Jan	20:00	Switzerland	2–3	Ukraine	20–25	28–26	21–25	25–15	14–16	108–107	Report
9 Jan	20:15	Macedonia	3–0	Hungary	25–21	25–20	25–21			75–62	Report

=== Pool G ===
Pos	Team	Pld	W	L	Pts	SW	SL	SR	SPW	SPL	SPR	Qualification
1	Greece	6	6	0	17	18	2	9.000	482	373	1.292	2019 European Championship
2	Azerbaijan	6	3	3	8	11	14	0.786	507	563	0.901	
3	Sweden	6	2	4	8	10	13	0.769	494	483	1.023	
4	Luxembourg	6	1	5	3	7	17	0.412	496	560	0.886	

Date	Time		Score		Set 1	Set 2	Set 3	Set 4	Set 5	Total	Report
15 Aug	18:00	Azerbaijan	3–2	Sweden	23–25	19–25	26–24	25–22	15–10	108–106	Report
15 Aug	21:30	Greece	3–0	Luxembourg	25–21	25–21	25–20			75–62	Report
18 Aug	17:00	Sweden	0–3	Greece	20–25	20–25	16–25			56–75	Report
18 Aug	19:00	Luxembourg	2–3	Azerbaijan	28–30	23–25	25–23	25–20	11–15	112–113	Report
22 Aug	19:00	Sweden	3–1	Luxembourg	22–25	25–14	25–17	25–14		97–70	Report
22 Aug	20:30	Greece	3–0	Azerbaijan	25–14	25–18	25–13			75–45	Report
25 Aug	19:00	Luxembourg	3–2	Sweden	23–25	19–25	25–20	25–22	15–10	107–102	Report
26 Aug	18:00	Azerbaijan	2–3	Greece	25–20	25–22	22–25	18–25	5–15	95–107	Report
5 Jan	18:00	Azerbaijan	3–1	Luxembourg	25–18	27–25	21–25	25–20		98–88	Report
5 Jan	17:00	Greece	3–0	Sweden	25–18	25–18	25–22			75–58	Report
9 Jan	17:00	Sweden	3–0	Azerbaijan	25–13	25–19	25–16			75–48	Report
9 Jan	19:00	Luxembourg	0–3	Greece	20–25	16–25	21–25			57–75	Report

=== Ranking of the second placed teams ===
- Matches against the fourth placed team in each pool are not included in this ranking.
- The top five of the second placed teams qualified for the 2019 European Championship.

Pos	Team	Pld	W	L	Pts	SW	SL	SR	SPW	SPL	SPR	Qualification
1	Spain	4	2	2	8	10	7	1.429	376	366	1.027	2019 European Championship
2	Montenegro	4	2	2	7	8	6	1.333	321	304	1.056	2019 European Championship
3	Finland	4	2	2	7	9	7	1.286	355	321	1.106	2019 European Championship
4	Austria	4	2	2	7	8	7	1.143	338	347	0.974	2019 European Championship
5	Macedonia	4	1	3	4	8	11	0.727	408	422	0.967	2019 European Championship
6	Israel	4	1	3	3	5	9	0.556	316	344	0.919	
7	Azerbaijan	4	1	3	3	5	11	0.455	296	363	0.815	
