= Volleyball at the 2008 Summer Olympics – Men's European qualification =

The European qualification for the 2008 Men's Olympic Volleyball Tournament was held from 1 September 2007 to 13 January 2008.

== Elimination round ==
- Dates: 1–9 September 2007
- All times are local.
- In case of an aggregate score tie, teams play a Golden Set to determine the winner.

Team 1	Agg.	Team 2	1st leg	2nd leg
Montenegro	6–3	Latvia	3–1	3–2
Romania	6–0	Georgia	3–0	3–0
Austria	3–5	Sweden	3–2	0–3
Azerbaijan	0–6	Denmark	0–3	0–3

=== First leg ===
Date	Time		Score		Set 1	Set 2	Set 3	Set 4	Set 5	Total
1 Sep	18:00	Romania	3–0	Georgia	25–12	25–19	25–16			75–47
1 Sep	20:00	Montenegro	3–1	Latvia	25–22	25–18	18–25	25–23		93–88
1 Sep	20:15	Austria	3–2	Sweden	25–21	23–25	25–20	22–25	16–14	111–105
2 Sep	18:00	Azerbaijan	0–3	Denmark	23–25	29–31	21–25			73–81

=== Second leg ===
Date	Time		Score		Set 1	Set 2	Set 3	Set 4	Set 5	Total
2 Sep	18:00	Romania	3–0	Georgia	25–13	25–20	25–17			75–50
8 Sep	17:30	Denmark	3–0	Azerbaijan	25–17	25–15	25–22			75–54
9 Sep	16:00	Sweden	3–0	Austria	25–10	25–14	25–23			75–47
9 Sep	18:00	Latvia	2–3	Montenegro	23–25	23–25	25–22	25–23	19–21	115–116

== Pre–qualification tournaments ==
- The Qualification Tournament hosts Turkey, the three 2007 World Cup participants and the next-best ranked team from the 2007 European Championship which are not yet qualified directly qualified for the Qualification Tournament.

=== Tournament 1 ===
- Venue: Arena Savaria, Szombathely, Hungary
- Dates: 28 November – 2 December 2007
- All times are Central European Time (UTC+01:00).

==== Preliminary round ====
===== Pool A =====
Pos	Team	Pld	W	L	Pts	SW	SL	SR	SPW	SPL	SPR	Qualification
1	Finland	2	2	0	4	6	2	3.000	183	154	1.188	Semifinals
2	Hungary	2	1	1	3	3	3	1.000	132	137	0.964	Semifinals
3	Estonia	2	0	2	2	2	6	0.333	159	183	0.869	

Date	Time		Score		Set 1	Set 2	Set 3	Set 4	Set 5	Total
28 Nov	20:00	Estonia	2–3	Finland	21–25	17–25	25–21	25–22	9–15	97–108
29 Nov	20:00	Hungary	3–0	Estonia	25–19	25–22	25–21			75–62
30 Nov	20:00	Finland	3–0	Hungary	25–22	25–19	25–16			75–57

===== Pool B =====
Pos	Team	Pld	W	L	Pts	SW	SL	SR	SPW	SPL	SPR	Qualification
1	Poland	2	2	0	4	6	0	MAX	150	118	1.271	Semifinals
2	Belgium	2	1	1	3	3	3	1.000	137	143	0.958	Semifinals
3	Denmark	2	0	2	2	0	6	0.000	127	153	0.830	

Date	Time		Score		Set 1	Set 2	Set 3	Set 4	Set 5	Total
28 Nov	17:30	Denmark	0–3	Belgium	26–28	22–25	20–25			68–78
29 Nov	17:30	Poland	3–0	Denmark	25–21	25–19	25–19			75–59
30 Nov	17:30	Belgium	0–3	Poland	22–25	18–25	19–25			59–75

==== Final round ====
Semifinals
1 December
Finland	3
Belgium	0
1 December
Poland	3
Hungary	1

Final
2 December
Finland	0
Poland	3

===== Semifinals =====
Date	Time		Score		Set 1	Set 2	Set 3	Set 4	Set 5	Total
1 Dec	15:30	Finland	3–0	Belgium	25–21	25–22	26–24			76–67
1 Dec	18:00	Poland	3–1	Hungary	25–14	25–18	20–25	25–17		95–74

===== Final =====
Date	Time		Score		Set 1	Set 2	Set 3	Set 4	Set 5	Total
2 Dec	15:00	Finland	0–3	Poland	20–25	18–25	25–27			63–77

==== Final standing ====
Rank	Team
1	Poland
2	Finland
3	Belgium
3	Hungary
5	Denmark
5	Estonia

Qualified for the Qualification tournament

=== Tournament 2 ===
- Venue: Arena D'Évora, Évora, Portugal
- Dates: 28 November – 2 December 2007
- All times are Western European Time (UTC±0).

==== Preliminary round ====
===== Pool A =====
Pos	Team	Pld	W	L	Pts	SW	SL	SR	SPW	SPL	SPR	Qualification
1	Germany	2	1	1	3	5	3	1.667	188	179	1.050	Semifinals
2	Czech Republic	2	1	1	3	5	5	1.000	213	213	1.000	Semifinals
3	Portugal	2	1	1	3	3	5	0.600	175	184	0.951	

Date	Time		Score		Set 1	Set 2	Set 3	Set 4	Set 5	Total
28 Nov	15:30	Czech Republic	2–3	Portugal	21–25	25–19	22–25	25–20	12–15	105–104
29 Nov	15:00	Germany	2–3	Czech Republic	25–18	26–24	24–26	23–25	11–15	109–108
30 Nov	18:30	Portugal	0–3	Germany	25–27	25–27	21–25			71–79

===== Pool B =====
Pos	Team	Pld	W	L	Pts	SW	SL	SR	SPW	SPL	SPR	Qualification
1	France	2	2	0	4	6	0	MAX	151	124	1.218	Semifinals
2	Sweden	2	1	1	3	3	5	0.600	188	194	0.969	Semifinals
3	Slovakia	2	0	2	2	2	6	0.333	172	193	0.891	

Date	Time		Score		Set 1	Set 2	Set 3	Set 4	Set 5	Total
28 Nov	19:00	Sweden	3–2	Slovakia	28–26	22–25	30–28	22–25	16–14	118–118
29 Nov	18:30	France	3–0	Sweden	25–23	25–23	26–24			76–70
30 Nov	15:00	Slovakia	0–3	France	15–25	18–25	21–25			54–75

==== Final round ====
Semifinals
1 December
Germany	3
Sweden	0
1 December
France	0
Czech Republic	3

Final
2 December
Germany	3
Czech Republic	2

===== Semifinals =====
Date	Time		Score		Set 1	Set 2	Set 3	Set 4	Set 5	Total
1 Dec	15:05	France	0–3	Czech Republic	19–25	20–25	14–25			53–75
1 Dec	18:30	Germany	3–0	Sweden	25–19	25–11	25–21			75–51

===== Final =====
Date	Time		Score		Set 1	Set 2	Set 3	Set 4	Set 5	Total
2 Dec	16:05	Germany	3–2	Czech Republic	25–22	21–25	25–17	22–25	15–13	108–102

==== Final standing ====
Rank	Team
1	Germany
2	Czech Republic
3	France
3	Sweden
5	Portugal
5	Slovakia

Qualified for the Qualification tournament

=== Tournament 3 ===
- Venue: PalaCatania, Catania, Italy
- Dates: 28 November – 2 December 2007
- All times are Central European Time (UTC+01:00).

==== Preliminary round ====
===== Pool A =====
Pos	Team	Pld	W	L	Pts	SW	SL	SR	SPW	SPL	SPR	Qualification
1	Italy	2	2	0	4	6	2	3.000	186	172	1.081	Semifinals
2	Croatia	2	1	1	3	5	4	1.250	214	197	1.086	Semifinals
3	Montenegro	2	0	2	2	1	6	0.167	144	175	0.823	

Date	Time		Score		Set 1	Set 2	Set 3	Set 4	Set 5	Total
28 Nov	20:30	Italy	3–0	Montenegro	25–18	25–19	25–21			75–58
29 Nov	17:30	Croatia	2–3	Italy	24–26	22–25	25–20	25–20	18–20	114–111
30 Nov	20:00	Montenegro	1–3	Croatia	25–22	22–25	13–25	26–28		86–100

===== Pool B =====
Pos	Team	Pld	W	L	Pts	SW	SL	SR	SPW	SPL	SPR	Qualification
1	Netherlands	2	2	0	4	6	0	MAX	154	125	1.232	Semifinals
2	Greece	2	1	1	3	3	4	0.750	160	161	0.994	Semifinals
3	Romania	2	0	2	2	1	6	0.167	144	172	0.837	

Date	Time		Score		Set 1	Set 2	Set 3	Set 4	Set 5	Total
28 Nov	18:00	Netherlands	3–0	Romania	26–24	25–18	25–19			76–61
29 Nov	20:00	Greece	0–3	Netherlands	19–25	26–28	19–25			64–78
30 Nov	17:30	Romania	1–3	Greece	25–21	22–25	21–25	15–25		83–96

==== Final round ====
Semifinals
1 December
Italy	3
Greece	0
1 December
Netherlands	3
Croatia	0

Final
2 December
Italy	3
Netherlands	2

===== Semifinals =====
Date	Time		Score		Set 1	Set 2	Set 3	Set 4	Set 5	Total
1 Dec	16:00	Italy	3–0	Greece	25–15	25–19	25–19			75–53
1 Dec	18:30	Netherlands	3–0	Croatia	25–22	25–18	27–25			77–65

===== Final =====
Date	Time		Score		Set 1	Set 2	Set 3	Set 4	Set 5	Total
2 Dec	18:00	Italy	3–2	Netherlands	20–25	21–25	25–20	25–21	15–13	106–104

==== Final standing ====
Rank	Team
1	Italy
2	Netherlands
3	Croatia
3	Greece
5	Montenegro
5	Romania

Qualified for the Qualification tournament

=== Second ranked teams ===
- Russia and Bulgaria qualified for the 2008 Summer Olympics via the 2007 World Cup and are replaced by the top two second ranked teams.

Pos	Team	Pld	W	L	Pts	SW	SL	SR	SPW	SPL	SPR	Qualification
1	Netherlands	4	3	1	7	11	3	3.667	335	296	1.132	Qualification tournament
2	Finland	4	3	1	7	9	5	1.800	322	298	1.081	Qualification tournament
3	Czech Republic	4	2	2	6	10	8	1.250	390	374	1.043	

== Qualification tournament ==
- Venue: Halkapınar Sport Hall, İzmir, Turkey
- Dates: 7–13 January 2008
- All times are Eastern European Time (UTC+02:00).

=== Preliminary round ===
==== Pool A ====
Pos	Team	Pld	W	L	Pts	SW	SL	SR	SPW	SPL	SPR	Qualification
1	Spain	3	2	1	5	7	7	1.000	292	307	0.951	Semifinals
2	Netherlands	3	2	1	5	6	6	1.000	253	269	0.941	Semifinals
3	Poland	3	1	2	4	7	6	1.167	288	275	1.047	
4	Italy	3	1	2	4	5	6	0.833	246	228	1.079	

Date	Time		Score		Set 1	Set 2	Set 3	Set 4	Set 5	Total
7 Jan	15:30	Italy	3–0	Netherlands	29–27	25–18	25–10			79–55
7 Jan	20:30	Spain	3–2	Poland	19–25	25–22	26–28	25–21	15–11	110–107
8 Jan	18:00	Poland	3–0	Italy	25–20	26–24	25–21			76–65
9 Jan	15:30	Italy	2–3	Spain	21–25	25–13	25–19	19–25	12–15	102–97
9 Jan	20:30	Netherlands	3–2	Poland	19–25	25–23	25–19	16–25	15–13	100–105
10 Jan	18:00	Spain	1–3	Netherlands	24–26	25–22	19–25	17–25		85–98

==== Pool B ====
Pos	Team	Pld	W	L	Pts	SW	SL	SR	SPW	SPL	SPR	Qualification
1	Serbia	3	2	1	5	8	4	2.000	276	260	1.062	Semifinals
2	Finland	3	2	1	5	6	5	1.200	259	241	1.075	Semifinals
3	Germany	3	2	1	5	6	7	0.857	268	279	0.961	
4	Turkey	3	0	3	3	5	9	0.556	296	319	0.928	

Date	Time		Score		Set 1	Set 2	Set 3	Set 4	Set 5	Total
7 Jan	18:00	Turkey	2–3	Finland	34–32	18–25	25–22	22–25	12–15	111–119
8 Jan	15:30	Serbia	3–0	Finland	26–24	25–23	25–18			76–65
8 Jan	20:30	Germany	3–2	Turkey	25–20	17–25	21–25	25–19	15–12	103–101
9 Jan	18:00	Serbia	2–3	Germany	22–25	26–24	25–22	19–25	11–15	103–111
10 Jan	15:30	Finland	3–0	Germany	25–23	25–15	25–16			75–54
10 Jan	20:30	Turkey	1–3	Serbia	25–22	21–25	23–25	15–25		84–97

=== Final round ===
Semifinals
12 January
Spain	3
Finland	1
12 January
Serbia	3
Netherlands	0

Final
13 January
Spain	2
Serbia	3

==== Semifinals ====
Date	Time		Score		Set 1	Set 2	Set 3	Set 4	Set 5	Total
12 Jan	16:30	Spain	3–1	Finland	25–22	21–25	25–16	25–16		96–79
12 Jan	19:00	Serbia	3–0	Netherlands	25–23	27–25	25–21			77–69

==== Final ====
Date	Time		Score		Set 1	Set 2	Set 3	Set 4	Set 5	Total
13 Jan	16:00	Spain	2–3	Serbia	26–24	25–16	19–25	15–25	15–17	100–107

=== Final standing ===
Rank	Team
1	Serbia
2	Spain
3	Finland
3	Netherlands
5	Germany
5	Poland
7	Italy
7	Turkey

Qualified for the 2008 Summer Olympics
