= 2013 Men's European Volleyball Championship qualification =

Men's European Volleyball Championship qualification

The qualification for the 2013 Men's European Volleyball Championship was held from May 12, 2012, to May 26, 2013. Nine teams qualified for the 2013 Men's European Volleyball Championship tournament, namely the six group winners of the Second Round, together with the three winners of the Third Round.

== First round ==
- Dates: May 12–20, 2012
- All times are local.
- In case of a 1–1 tie, teams played a Golden Set to determine the winner.

Team 1	Agg.	Team 2	1st leg	2nd leg
Cyprus	0–2	Romania	2–3	1–3
Andorra	0–2	Israel	1–3	0–3
Albania	0–2	Great Britain	0–3	0–3
Switzerland	0–2	Croatia	0–3	2–3
Luxembourg	0–2	Sweden	0–3	0–3

=== First leg ===
Date	Time		Score		Set 1	Set 2	Set 3	Set 4	Set 5	Total	Report
12 May	17:00	Switzerland	0–3	Croatia	21–25	22–25	20–25			63–75	Report
12 May	18:00	Albania	0–3	Great Britain	25–27	23–25	20–25			68–77	Report
13 May	12:00	Andorra	1–3	Israel	16–25	10–25	26–24	13–25		65–99	Report
13 May	19:00	Cyprus	2–3	Romania	24–26	26–24	14–25	25–22	6–15	95–112	Report
13 May	19:00	Luxembourg	0–3	Sweden	23–25	20–25	17–25			60–75	Report

=== Second leg ===
Date	Time		Score		Set 1	Set 2	Set 3	Set 4	Set 5	Total	Report
19 May	15:00	Great Britain	3–0	Albania	25–17	25–17	25–22			75–56	Report
19 May	17:00	Romania	3–1	Cyprus	20–25	25–20	25–22	25–23		95–90	Report
19 May	18:00	Croatia	3–2	Switzerland	21–25	22–25	25–22	25–22	15–8	108–102	Report
19 May	19:00	Israel	3–0	Andorra	25–10	25–17	25–21			75–48	Report
20 May	17:00	Sweden	3–0	Luxembourg	25–20	26–24	25–12			76–56	Report

== Second round ==
The six group winners qualified directly for the 2013 Men's European Volleyball Championship, while the six runners-up moved on to the Third Round where three more teams qualified.

Group A	Group B	Group C	Group D	Group E	Group F
Host : Portugal and Turkey Turkey; Portugal; Belarus; Great Britain	Host : Belgium and Estonia Estonia; Belgium; Netherlands; Israel	Host : Austria and Czech Republic Czech Republic; Austria; Macedonia; Croatia	Host : Greece and Finland Finland; Greece; Montenegro; Romania	Host : Ukraine and Slovenia Slovenia; Germany; Ukraine; Sweden	Host : Hungary and Latvia France; Spain; Latvia; Hungary

All times are local.

=== Pool A ===
Pos	Team	Pld	W	L	Pts	SW	SL	SR	SPW	SPL	SPR	Qualification
1	Belarus	6	4	2	12	15	10	1.500	571	532	1.073	Qualified
2	Turkey	6	3	3	11	14	11	1.273	571	431	1.325	Third round
3	Portugal	6	4	2	9	13	12	1.083	537	549	0.978	Eliminated
4	Great Britain	6	1	5	4	8	17	0.471	506	573	0.883	Eliminated

==== Tournament 1 ====
The tournament was held at Pavilhao de Desportos in Vila do Conde, Portugal.

Date	Time		Score		Set 1	Set 2	Set 3	Set 4	Set 5	Total	Report
7 Sep	17:00	Portugal	3–2	Great Britain	26–24	22–25	20–25	25–18	15–10	108–102	Report
7 Sep	19:30	Turkey	1–3	Belarus	17–25	25–27	25–23	20–25		87–100	Report
8 Sep	15:00	Great Britain	3–2	Turkey	17–25	25–20	25–20	13–25	26–24	106–114	Report
8 Sep	17:30	Belarus	3–0	Portugal	25–19	25–20	29–27			79–66	Report
9 Sep	16:30	Great Britain	1–3	Belarus	15–25	25–23	23–25	19–25		82–98	Report
9 Sep	19:30	Portugal	3–2	Turkey	25–23	20–25	27–25	22–25	15–13	109–111	Report

==== Tournament 2 ====
The tournament was held at Başkent Volleyball Hall in Ankara, Turkey.

Date	Time		Score		Set 1	Set 2	Set 3	Set 4	Set 5	Total	Report
14 Sep	16:00	Belarus	2–3	Portugal	21–25	25–23	23–25	25–20	14–16	108–109	Report
14 Sep	18:30	Turkey	3–0	Great Britain	25–16	25–17	25–20			75–53	Report
15 Sep	16:00	Portugal	3–0	Great Britain	25–18	25–17	28–26			78–61	Report
15 Sep	18:30	Belarus	1–3	Turkey	20–25	25–19	14–25	19–25		78–94	Report
16 Sep	16:00	Great Britain	2–3	Belarus	25–20	14–25	25–23	19–25	11–15	94–108	Report
16 Sep	18:30	Turkey	3–1	Portugal	25–12	23–25	25–20	25–20		98–77	Report

=== Pool B ===
Pos	Team	Pld	W	L	Pts	SW	SL	SR	SPW	SPL	SPR	Qualification
1	Netherlands	6	4	2	13	19	8	2.375	549	508	1.081	Qualified
2	Belgium	6	5	1	12	16	9	1.778	571	533	1.071	Third round
3	Estonia	6	2	4	9	10	14	0.714	549	571	0.961	Eliminated
4	Israel	6	1	5	2	4	17	0.235	442	496	0.891	Eliminated

==== Tournament 1 ====
The tournament was held at Sportcampus Lange Munte in Kortrijk, Belgium.

Date	Time		Score		Set 1	Set 2	Set 3	Set 4	Set 5	Total	Report
7 Sep	17:00	Belgium	3–0	Israel	25–20	25–22	25–21			75–63	Report
7 Sep	20:30	Netherlands	3–2	Estonia	25–23	25–17	23–25	21–25	15–13	109–103	Report
8 Sep	17:00	Belgium	3–2	Netherlands	17–25	20–25	25–16	25–18	20–18	107–102	Report
8 Sep	20:30	Israel	3–2	Estonia	25–21	22–25	18–25	25–17	15–12	105–100	Report
9 Sep	15:00	Netherlands	3–0	Israel	25–23	25–21	25–18			75–62	Report
9 Sep	18:30	Estonia	2–3	Belgium	25–20	25–23	22–25	20–25	10–15	102–108	Report

==== Tournament 2 ====
The tournament was held at Kalev Sports Hall in Tallinn, Estonia.

Date	Time		Score		Set 1	Set 2	Set 3	Set 4	Set 5	Total	Report
14 Sep	17:00	Belgium	3–2	Netherlands	23–25	23–25	25–21	25–22	21–19	117–112	Report
14 Sep	20:00	Israel	1–3	Estonia	19–25	18–25	25–20	24–26		86–96	Report
15 Sep	17:00	Netherlands	3–0	Israel	27–25	25–19	25–20			77–64	Report
15 Sep	20:00	Estonia	3–1	Belgium	17–25	25–22	25–22	25–20		92–89	Report
16 Sep	17:00	Israel	0–3	Belgium	18–25	21–25	23–25			62–75	Report
16 Sep	20:00	Netherlands	3–0	Estonia	25–22	25–16	25–18			75–56	Report

=== Pool C ===
Pos	Team	Pld	W	L	Pts	SW	SL	SR	SPW	SPL	SPR	Qualification
1	Czech Republic	6	6	0	18	18	1	18.000	474	364	1.302	Qualified
2	Croatia	6	2	4	6	9	13	0.692	477	527	0.905	Third round
3	Austria	6	2	4	6	9	15	0.600	520	532	0.977	Eliminated
4	Macedonia	6	2	4	6	8	17	0.471	481	538	0.894	Eliminated

==== Tournament 1 ====
The tournament was held at Budocenter in Vienna, Austria.

Date	Time		Score		Set 1	Set 2	Set 3	Set 4	Set 5	Total	Report
6 Sep	18:00	Macedonia	2–3	Austria	25–23	23–25	25–21	22–25	13–15	108–109	Report
6 Sep	20:30	Czech Republic	3–1	Croatia	21–25	25–22	25–17	25–19		96–83	Report
7 Sep	18:00	Austria	1–3	Croatia	23–25	20–25	25–19	24–26		92–95	Report
7 Sep	20:30	Macedonia	0–3	Czech Republic	16–25	19–25	22–25			57–75	Report
8 Sep	18:00	Austria	0–3	Czech Republic	20–25	21–25	16–25			57–75	Report
8 Sep	20:30	Croatia	3–0	Macedonia	25–22	25–19	28–26			78–67	Report

==== Tournament 2 ====
The tournament was held at Sport Hall Sareza in Ostrava, Czech Republic.

Date	Time		Score		Set 1	Set 2	Set 3	Set 4	Set 5	Total	Report
14 Sep	15:00	Macedonia	3–1	Croatia	20–25	25–18	25–18	25–19		95–80	Report
14 Sep	18:00	Czech Republic	3–0	Austria	25–19	28–26	25–18			78–63	Report
15 Sep	15:00	Croatia	1–3	Austria	19–25	17–25	29–27	21–25		86–102	Report
15 Sep	18:00	Macedonia	0–3	Czech Republic	20–25	15–25	14–25			49–75	Report
16 Sep	15:00	Austria	2–3	Macedonia	21–25	25–17	25–15	21–25	13–15	105–97	Report
16 Sep	18:00	Czech Republic	3–0	Croatia	25–15	25–21	25–19			75–55	Report

=== Pool D ===
Pos	Team	Pld	W	L	Pts	SW	SL	SR	SPW	SPL	SPR	Qualification
1	Finland	6	5	1	14	15	5	3.000	478	390	1.226	Qualified
2	Greece	6	4	2	10	12	10	1.200	494	458	1.079	Third round
3	Montenegro	6	2	4	9	12	12	1.000	547	523	1.046	Eliminated
4	Romania	6	1	5	3	5	17	0.294	394	510	0.773	Eliminated

==== Tournament 1 ====
The tournament was held at Municipal Sports Hall Trikala in Trikala, Greece.

Date	Time		Score		Set 1	Set 2	Set 3	Set 4	Set 5	Total	Report
6 Sep	17:30	Montenegro	0–3	Finland	22–25	25–27	20–25			67–77	Report
6 Sep	20:30	Romania	2–3	Greece	14–25	18–25	25–21	25–21	12–15	94–107	Report
7 Sep	17:30	Finland	3–0	Romania	25–15	25–14	25–17			75–46	Report
7 Sep	20:30	Greece	0–3	Montenegro	30–32	21–25	20–25			71–82	Report
8 Sep	17:30	Romania	0–3	Montenegro	21–25	20–25	16–25			57–75	Report
8 Sep	20:30	Greece	3–0	Finland	25–19	25–21	25–23			75–63	Report

==== Tournament 2 ====
The tournament was held at Energia Areena in Vantaa, Finland.

Date	Time		Score		Set 1	Set 2	Set 3	Set 4	Set 5	Total	Report
14 Sep	15:00	Greece	3–2	Montenegro	25–20	25–18	32–34	22–25	15–11	119–108	Report
14 Sep	18:00	Finland	3–0	Romania	25–20	25–17	25–17			75–54	Report
15 Sep	15:00	Montenegro	2–3	Romania	25–15	25–27	25–15	20–25	8–15	103–97	Report
15 Sep	18:00	Greece	0–3	Finland	16–25	17–25	14–25			47–75	Report
16 Sep	15:00	Romania	0–3	Greece	18–25	12–25	16–25			46–75	Report
16 Sep	18:00	Finland	3–2	Montenegro	25–18	21–25	25–21	27–29	15–8	113–101	Report

=== Pool E ===
Pos	Team	Pld	W	L	Pts	SW	SL	SR	SPW	SPL	SPR	Qualification
1	Germany	6	6	0	18	18	2	9.000	497	401	1.239	Qualified
2	Slovenia	6	3	3	9	10	10	1.000	446	432	1.032	Third round
3	Ukraine	6	3	3	8	11	12	0.917	526	514	1.023	Eliminated
4	Sweden	6	0	6	1	3	18	0.167	390	512	0.762	Eliminated

==== Tournament 1 ====
The tournament was held at Palace of Sports in Kharkiv, Ukraine.

Date	Time		Score		Set 1	Set 2	Set 3	Set 4	Set 5	Total	Report
7 Sep	16:00	Slovenia	3–1	Sweden	25–23	23–25	25–10	25–21		98–79	Report
7 Sep	18:30	Germany	3–1	Ukraine	25–22	22–25	26–24	25–22		98–93	Report
8 Sep	16:00	Slovenia	0–3	Germany	23–25	18–25	21–25			62–75	Report
8 Sep	18:30	Sweden	2–3	Ukraine	25–22	20–25	29–27	18–25	8–15	100–114	Report
9 Sep	16:00	Germany	3–0	Sweden	25–22	25–20	25–19			75–61	Report
9 Sep	18:30	Ukraine	0–3	Slovenia	21–25	21–25	23–25			65–75	Report

==== Tournament 2 ====
The tournament was held at Ljudski vrt Sports Hall in Maribor, Slovenia.

Date	Time		Score		Set 1	Set 2	Set 3	Set 4	Set 5	Total	Report
13 Sep	17:00	Germany	3–1	Ukraine	25–20	24–26	25–23	25–18		99–87	Report
13 Sep	20:00	Slovenia	3–0	Sweden	25–22	25–13	25–11			75–46	Report
14 Sep	17:00	Ukraine	3–0	Sweden	25–18	25–18	25–20			75–56	Report
14 Sep	20:00	Germany	3–0	Slovenia	25–12	25–22	25–16			75–50	Report
15 Sep	17:00	Sweden	0–3	Germany	17–25	18–25	13–25			48–75	Report
15 Sep	20:00	Slovenia	1–3	Ukraine	25–16	14–25	23–25	24–26		86–92	Report

=== Pool F ===
Pos	Team	Pld	W	L	Pts	SW	SL	SR	SPW	SPL	SPR	Qualification
1	France	6	6	0	18	18	3	6.000	506	432	1.171	Qualified
2	Latvia	6	4	2	11	14	11	1.273	571	528	1.081	Third round
3	Spain	6	2	4	7	10	11	0.909	535	538	0.994	Eliminated
4	Hungary	6	0	6	0	4	15	0.267	428	542	0.790	Eliminated

==== Tournament 1 ====
The tournament was held at Városi Sportcsarnok in Szeged, Hungary.

Date	Time		Score		Set 1	Set 2	Set 3	Set 4	Set 5	Total	Report
6 Sep	16:00	France	3–1	Spain	25–18	25–14	17–25	28–26		95–83	Report
6 Sep	19:00	Latvia	3–1	Hungary	25–19	18–25	25–19	25–19		93–82	Report
7 Sep	15:30	France	3–1	Latvia	25–18	19–25	25–18	25–22		94–83	Report
7 Sep	18:00	Spain	3–1	Hungary	25–17	23–25	25–16	25–18		98–76	Report
8 Sep	16:00	Latvia	3–2	Spain	25–18	20–25	22–25	25–18	15–8	107–94	Report
8 Sep	19:00	Hungary	0–3	France	20–25	15–25	16–25			51–75	Report

==== Tournament 2 ====
The tournament was held at Zemgales Olympic Center in Jelgava, Latvia.

Date	Time		Score		Set 1	Set 2	Set 3	Set 4	Set 5	Total	Report
14 Sep	17:00	Spain	0–3	France	22–25	21–25	19–25			62–75	Report
14 Sep	19:30	Latvia	3–1	Hungary	24–26	25–14	25–14	25–16		99–70	Report
15 Sep	15:30	France	3–0	Hungary	26–24	25–19	25–20			76–63	Report
15 Sep	18:00	Spain	1–3	Latvia	25–21	23–25	26–28	23–25		97–99	Report
16 Sep	15:30	Hungary	1–3	Spain	13–25	26–24	25–27	22–25		86–101	Report
16 Sep	18:00	France	3–1	Latvia	15–25	25–21	26–24	25–20		91–90	Report

== Third round ==
- Dates: May 31 – June 9, 2013
- All times are local.
- In case of a 1–1 tie, teams played a Golden Set to determine the winner.

Team 1	Agg.	Team 2	1st leg	2nd leg
Croatia	0–2	Slovenia	1–3	0–3
Greece	1–1^{1}	Belgium	0–3	3–2
Turkey	^{2}1–1	Latvia	3–0	2–3

- ^{1} Belgium won the golden set 15–12.
- ^{2} Turkey won the golden set 15–10

=== First leg ===
Date	Time		Score		Set 1	Set 2	Set 3	Set 4	Set 5	Total	Report
1 Jun	19:00	Greece	0–3	Belgium	21–25	14–25	19–25			54–75	Report
2 Jun	18:00	Croatia	1–3	Slovenia	25–22	16–25	16–25	19–25		76–97	Report
2 Jun	18:30	Turkey	3–0	Latvia	25–20	25–17	25–23			75–60	Report

=== Second leg ===
Date	Time		Score		Set 1	Set 2	Set 3	Set 4	Set 5	Total	Report
8 Jun	18:00	Slovenia	3–0	Croatia	25–21	26–24	25–17			76–62	Report
8 Jun	20:30	Belgium	2–3	Greece	25–19	21–25	25–18	21–25	13–15	105–102	Report
9 Jun	17:00	Latvia	3–2	Turkey	25–19	21–25	27–29	25–16	15–13	113–102	Report
