= 1971 Men's European Volleyball Championship =

Tournament details
- Host country: Italy
- Dates: September 23–October 1
- Teams: 22
- Venues: 6 (in 6 host cities)

Final positions
- Champions: Soviet Union (4th title)

The 1971 Men's European Volleyball Championship was the eighth edition of the event, organized by Europe's governing volleyball body, the Confédération Européenne de Volleyball. It was hosted in several cities in Italy from September 23 to October 1, 1971, with the final round held in Milan.

== Teams ==
Group A – Forlì

- ~~Albania~~ (did not compete)
- Belgium
- ~~England~~ (did not compete)
- Soviet Union

Group B – Bergamo

- Czechoslovakia
- Israel
- Scotland
- Turkey

Group C – Ancona

- Denmark
- France
- Netherlands
- Poland

Group D – Milan

- Bulgaria
- East Germany
- Sweden
- Switzerland

Group E – Turin

- Finland
- Greece
- Italy
- Romania

Group F – Modena

- Austria
- Hungary
- West Germany
- Yugoslavia

== Preliminary round ==
The standings for Group E were Romania P3 W3 L0 Italy P3 W2 L1 Finland P3 W1 L2 Greece P3 W0 L3

== Final ranking ==
| Place | Team |
|---|---|
| 1st place, gold medalist(s) | Soviet Union |
| 2nd place, silver medalist(s) | Czechoslovakia |
| 3rd place, bronze medalist(s) | Romania |
| 4. | East Germany |
| 5. | Hungary |
| 6. | Poland |
| 7. | Bulgaria |
| 8. | Italy |
| 9. | Netherlands |
| 10. | Belgium |
| 11. | Yugoslavia |
| 12. | Israel |
| 13. | Finland |
| 14. | France |
| 15. | Turkey |
| 16. | West Germany |
| 17. | Sweden |
| 18. | Greece |
| 19. | Switzerland |
| 20. | Denmark |
| 21. | Austria |
| 22. | Scotland |
| — | ~~Albania~~ |
| — | ~~England~~ |

1971 Men's European champions

Soviet Union
Fourth title
