= Norway men's national volleyball team =

Norway
- Association: Norwegian Volleyball Federation
- Confederation: CEV
- Head coach: Łukasz Marciniak
- FIVB ranking: 62 (5 October 2025)

Uniforms
Home	Away

Summer Olympics
- Appearances: No Appearances

World Championship
- Appearances: No Appearances

The Norway men's national volleyball team represents Norway in international men's volleyball competitions and friendly matches and it is ruled and managed by the Norwegian Volleyball Federation That is an affiliate of Federation of International Volleyball FIVB and also a part of European Volleyball Confederation CEV. However Norway Does not made any international Appearances Until Nowadays. They often Participate in European Qualifications Tournament, also since Norway Follow The NEVZA volleyball body for northern European countries, they plays often exhibition matches against these body members teams.

== Results ==
=== Summer Olympics ===
Champions Runners up Third place Fourth place

Summer Olympics record
Year	Round	Position	Pld	W	L	SW	SL	Squad
(Japan) 1964 To | (Japan) 2020	did not qualify							
Total	0 Titles	0/15						

=== World Championship ===
Champions Runners up Third place Fourth place

World Championship record
Year	Round	Position	Pld	W	L	SW	SL	Squad
(Czechoslovakia) 1949 To | (Philippines) 2025	Did not enter or Qualify							
Total	0 Titles	0/21						

=== European Championship ===
Champions Runners-up Third place 4th place

European Championship Qualifying Tournament
Year	Round	Position	Pld	W	L	SW	SL	Squad
2013	did not enter							
2015	Second Round	4th Place						
2017	Group Stages	2nd Place						
2019	Group Stages	Third Place						
2021	Group Stages	4th Place						
2023	Group Stages	4th Place						
Total	0 Titles	0/27						

== Team ==
=== Previous squad ===
#	Name	Position	Height	Weight	Birthday	Spike	Block
2	ESPELAND Oskar	Outside spiker	195	86	2001	360	338
5	HUUS Bjarne Nikolai	Outside spiker	187	80	1995	335	290
8	LANGLO Jonas Vindedal	Setter	188	79	1996	320	305
9	RAFTEVOLD Oskar	Outside spiker	193	70	1996	345	319
13	FLÅSKJER Sverre Grønnevik	Middle blocker	200	96	1996	343	320
	BERGUM Øystein	Libero	180	70	1995	310	300
	BJELLAND Eirik Mjelde	Middle blocker	202	81	2002	330	315
	FASTELAND Rune	Middle blocker	205	70	1995	350	340
	FORNES Jarle	Outside spiker	194	70	1995	326	303
	KVALEN Jonas	Outside spiker	195	70	1992	345	325
	OLIMSTAD Martin	Outside spiker	193	87	1997	335	315
	ØSTVIK Petter Alstad	Middle blocker	198	70	1998	340	310
	SUNDE Jo Gladsøy	Outside spiker	188	70	2003	340	314
	TAKVAM Andreas	Middle blocker	203	70	1993	368	310
	THELLE Jakob Solgaard	Setter	197	70	1999	350	330
	TVINDE Lars Fredrik	Setter	186	70	1992	338	315
