= Lithuania men's national volleyball team =

National volleyball team

Lithuania
- Association: Lietuvos tinklinio federacija
- Confederation: CEV

Uniforms
Home	Away
- https://www.ltf.lt

The Lithuania men's national volleyball team represents Lithuania in international men's volleyball competitions and friendly matches.

== History ==
Although volleyball was always regularly played in Lithuania, both men's and women's national teams were inactive for a long time. In 2014 the Lithuania men's national volleyball team participated in 2015 Men's European Volleyball Championship qualification tournament and it was the first Lithuanian team international appearance after 20 years of absence.
