= Denmark men's national volleyball team =

Men's national volleyball team representing Denmark

Denmark
- Association: Volleyball Danmark
- Confederation: CEV
- Head coach: Kristian Knudsen
- FIVB ranking: 27 ▲4 (1 October 2026)

Uniforms
Home	Away

World Championship
- Appearances: 1 (First in 1966)
- Best result: 22nd

European Championship
- Appearances: 5 (First in 1958)
- Best result: 12th (2013)
- Website
Honours
European League
Bronze medal – third place	2026 Finland/Netherlands	Team

The Denmark men's national volleyball team represents Denmark in international men's volleyball competitions and friendly matches.

== Results ==
=== World Cup ===
- 1966 - 22nd place
- 2027 – Qualified

=== European Championship ===
- 1958 – 20th place
- 1963 – 17th place
- 1971 – 20th place
- 2013 – 12th place
- 2023 – 24th place
- 2026 – 14th place
- 2028 – Qualified

=== European League ===
- 2012 – 7th place
- 2013 – 11th place
- 2014 – 10th place
- 2015 – 7th place
- 2016 – 5th place
- 2017 – 4th place
- 2022 – 10th place
- 2023 – 10th place
- 2026 – Bronze medal
