= Belarus men's national volleyball team =

Men's national volleyball team representing Belarus

Belarus
- Association: Volleyball Federation Of The Rep. Of Belarus (BVF)
- Confederation: CEV
- Head coach: Viktar Beksha
- FIVB ranking: NR (5 October 2025)

Uniforms
Home	Away

European Championship
- Appearances: 3 (First in 2013)
- Best result: 15th (2013)
- Official website
Honours
Challenger Cup
Bronze medal – third place	2019 Slovenia
European League
Silver medal – second place	2019 Estonia

The Belarus men's national volleyball team represented Belarus in international volleyball competitions and friendly matches. The team is currently not ranked in the world rankings.

In light of the 2022 Russian invasion of Ukraine, the European Volleyball Confederation (CEV) banned all Belarusian national teams, clubs, and officials from participating in European competition, and suspended all members of Belarus from their respective functions in CEV organs.

== Results ==
=== Challenger Cup ===
Champions Runners up Third place Fourth place

Challenger Cup record
Year	Round	Position	Pld	W	L	SW	SL	Squad
(Portugal) 2018	Did not enter							
(Slovenia) 2019	Final four	Third place	4	2	2	8	7	Squad
Total	1/2	0 Titles	4	2	2	8	7	

=== European Championship ===
Champions Runners up Third place Fourth place

European Championship record									Qualification		
Year	Round	Position	Pld	W	L	SW	SL	Squad	Pld	W	L
1948–1995	Did not enter								Did not enter		
(Netherlands) 1997	Did not qualify								8	1	7
(Austria) 1999	Did not qualify								10	3	7
2001–2003	Did not enter								Did not enter		
(Italy) (Serbia and Montenegro) 2005	Did not qualify								6	2	4
(Russia) 2007	Did not qualify								8	5	3
(Turkey) 2009	Did not qualify								6	3	3
(Austria) (Czech Republic) 2011	Did not qualify								6	3	3
(Denmark) (Poland) 2013	Group stage	15th place	3	0	3	3	9	Squad	6	4	2
(Bulgaria) (Italy) 2015	Group stage	16th place	3	0	3	0	9	Squad	6	2	4
(Poland) 2017	Did not qualify								6	2	4
(Belgium) (France) (Netherlands) (Slovenia) 2019	Group stage	22nd place	5	1	4	6	14	Squad	6	5	1
(Poland) (Czech Republic) (Estonia) (Finland) 2021	Group stage	17th place	5	2	3	7	10	Squad	6	4	2
(Italy) (Bulgaria) (Israel) (North Macedonia) 2023	Disqualified								Disqualified		
(Italy) (Bulgaria) (Finland) (Romania) 2026	Disqualified								Disqualified		
(Montenegro) 2028	To be determined								To be determined		
Total	4/35	0 Titles	16	3	13	16	42		74	34	40

=== European League ===
Champions Runners up Third place Fourth place

European League record
Year	Round	Position	Pld	W	L	SW	SL	Squad
2004–2006	Did not enter							
(Turkey) 2008	League round	5th place	12	6	6	22	25	Squad
(Portugal) 2009	League round	7th place	12	6	6	21	24	Squad
(Spain) 2010	Did not enter							
(Slovakia) 2011	League round	7th place	12	5	7	22	24	Squad
(Turkey) 2012	Did not enter							
(Turkey) 2013	League round	8th place	12	6	6	23	23	Squad
2014	Did not enter							
(Poland) 2015	League round	7th place	10	3	7	15	23	Squad
(Bulgaria) 2016	League round	6th place	6	2	4	10	12	Squad
(Denmark) 2017	Did not enter							
(Czech Republic) 2018	Silver League, Final Four	14th place (Silver)	8	6	2	20	5	Squad
(Estonia) 2019	Golden League, Final four	Runners up	8	5	3	18	12	Squad
Total	8/16	0 Titles	80	39	41	151	148	
