= Sweden men's national volleyball team =

Men's national volleyball team representing Sweden

Sweden
- Association: Svenska Volleybollförbundet
- Confederation: CEV
- Head coach: Gido Vermeulen
- FIVB ranking: 37 ▲2 (1 October 2026)

Uniforms
Home	Away
- www.volleyboll.se
Honours
European Championships
Silver medal – second place	1989 Sweden	Team competition

The Sweden men's national volleyball team represents Sweden in international men's volleyball competitions and friendly matches. The team's biggest success came in 1989, when Sweden won the silver medal at the 1989 European Championship in Örebro and Stockholm, from September 23 to October 1.

== Results ==
=== Olympic Games ===
- 1988 — 7th place

=== World Championship ===
- 1990 — 10th place
- 1994 — 16th place

=== European Championship ===
- 1971 — 17th place
- 1985 — 9th place
- 1987 — 4th place
- 1989 — Silver medal
- 1991 — 10th place
- 1993 — 11th place
- 2026 — 18th place

=== European League ===
- 2017 — Bronze medal
- 2025 — 13th place
- 2026 — 9th place
