= Azerbaijan men's national volleyball team =

National volleyball team

Azerbaijan
- Association: Azerbaijan Volleyball Federation
- Confederation: CEV
- Head coach: Farid Jalalov

Uniforms
Home	Away
- Website

The Azerbaijan men's national volleyball team represents Azerbaijan in international men's volleyball competitions and friendly matches.

== European League ==
Year	Position
(Montenegro) 2014	9th
(Poland) 2015	Did not enter
(Bulgaria) 2016	Did not enter
(Denmark) 2017	Did not enter
(Czech Republic) 2018	Did not enter
(Turkey) 2019	17th
(North Macedonia) 2021	Did not enter
(Croatia) 2022	Withdrew
(Croatia) 2023	Did not enter
(Croatia) 2024	12th
(Czech Republic) 2025	17th
(Finland) (Netherlands) 2026	22nd
Total	5/22

== Islamic Solidarity Games ==
Year	Position
(Saudi Arabia) 2005	5th
(Iran) 2010	Cancelled
(Indonesia) 2013	Did not enter
(Azerbaijan) 2017	Runners-up
(Turkey) 2021	4th
Total	3/3

== Memorial of Hubert Jerzy Wagner ==
Year	Position
(Poland) 2021	4th
Total	1/22
