= Switzerland men's national volleyball team =

Men's national volleyball team representing Switzerland

Switzerland
- Association: Swiss Volley
- Confederation: CEV
- Head coach: Juan Manuel Serramalera
- FIVB ranking: 28 (3 August 2026)

Uniforms
Home	Away

European Championship
- Appearances: 2 (First in 1971)
- Best result: 19th place 1971
- www.volleyball.ch

The Switzerland men's national volleyball team is the volleyball national team of Switzerland. It takes part in international volleyball competitions.

== Result history ==
=== European Championship ===
- 1971 Italy — 19th place
- 2023 Italy/Bulgaria/North Macedonia/Israel — 23rd place
- 2026 Bulgaria/Finland/Italy/Romania —21th place

== Team ==
=== Current roster ===
The following is the Switzerland roster for the 2017 Men's European Championship qualifiers.

Head Coach: Dario Bettello

No.	Name	Date of birth	Height	Weight	Spike	Block
1	Chrtistoph Hänggi	18 July 1993	1.93 m (6 ft 4 in)	89 kg (196 lb)	340 cm (130 in)	305 cm (120 in)
2	Marco Gygli	21 May 1987	1.83 m (6 ft 0 in)	82 kg (181 lb)	315 cm (124 in)	300 cm (120 in)
3	Jérôme Fellay	21 January 1989	1.88 m (6 ft 2 in)	76 kg (168 lb)	335 cm (132 in)	329 cm (130 in)
4	Simon Hofstede	25 September 1992	1.98 m (6 ft 6 in)	85 kg (187 lb)	344 cm (135 in)	320 cm (130 in)
5	Lorenz Eichhorn	11 November 1995	1.90 m (6 ft 3 in)	83 kg (183 lb)	340 cm (130 in)	310 cm (120 in)
6	Rito Giger	5 August 1991	1.94 m (6 ft 4 in)	82 kg (181 lb)	344 cm (135 in)	312 cm (123 in)
7	Sébastien Steigmeier	5 July 1989	2.01 m (6 ft 7 in)	100 kg (220 lb)	350 cm (140 in)	330 cm (130 in)
8	Joel Maag	20 June 1998	2.00 m (6 ft 7 in)	86 kg (190 lb)	338 cm (133 in)	315 cm (124 in)
8	Nemanja Savic	16 August 1990	2.00 m (6 ft 7 in)	92 kg (203 lb)	350 cm (140 in)	340 cm (130 in)
9	Peer Harksen	30 December 1995	1.94 m (6 ft 4 in)	83 kg (183 lb)	339 cm (133 in)	318 cm (125 in)
10	Luca Ulrich	12 January 1997	1.96 m (6 ft 5 in)	80 kg (180 lb)	345 cm (136 in)	335 cm (132 in)
11	Marc Walzer	2 March 1990	1.99 m (6 ft 6 in)	87 kg (192 lb)	338 cm (133 in)	320 cm (130 in)
12	Julian Fischer	4 November 1996	1.80 m (5 ft 11 in)	65 kg (143 lb)	315 cm (124 in)	300 cm (120 in)
12	Elias Wetzel	12 May 1993	1.95 m (6 ft 5 in)	90 kg (200 lb)	346 cm (136 in)	326 cm (128 in)
13	Joel Roos	1 July 1993	1.89 m (6 ft 2 in)	80 kg (180 lb)	330 cm (130 in)	325 cm (128 in)
14	Jovan Djokic	21 December 1993	1.90 m (6 ft 3 in)	80 kg (180 lb)	340 cm (130 in)	320 cm (130 in)
15	Manuel Sutter	25 July 1988	1.80 m (5 ft 11 in)	75 kg (165 lb)	315 cm (124 in)	295 cm (116 in)
16	Noel Giger	30 December 1992	1.98 m (6 ft 6 in)	90 kg (200 lb)	340 cm (130 in)	330 cm (130 in)
17	Thomas Brändli	12 May 1991	2.00 m (6 ft 7 in)	98 kg (216 lb)	330 cm (130 in)	315 cm (124 in)
18	Samuel Ehrat	20 April 1992	2.00 m (6 ft 7 in)	83 kg (183 lb)	350 cm (140 in)	335 cm (132 in)
19	Etienne Hagenbuch	21 March 1994	1.79 m (5 ft 10 in)	73 kg (161 lb)	315 cm (124 in)	305 cm (120 in)
20	Leandro Gerber	14 March 1991	1.94 m (6 ft 4 in)	85 kg (187 lb)	340 cm (130 in)	320 cm (130 in)
21	Frederic Wicki	16 April 1998	1.93 m (6 ft 4 in)	83 kg (183 lb)	330 cm (130 in)	315 cm (124 in)
