= Romania men's national volleyball team =

Men's national volleyball team representing Romania

Romania
- Association: Federaţia Română de Volei
- Confederation: CEV
- Head coach: Sergiu Stancu
- FIVB ranking: 33 (3 August 2026)

Uniforms
Home	Away

Summer Olympics
- Appearances: 3 (First in 1964)
- Best result: (bronze) 3rd

World Championship
- Appearances: 11 (First in 1949)
- Best result: (silver) 2nd

European Championship
- Appearances: 18 (First in 1950)
- Best result: Winner (1963)
- Website

Romania men's national volleyball team
Medal record

Olympic Games
Bronze medal – third place	1980 Moscow	Team

World Championship
Silver medal – second place	1956 France	Team
Silver medal – second place	1966 Czechoslovakia	Team
Bronze medal – third place	1960 Brazil	Team
Bronze medal – third place	1962 Soviet Union	Team

European Championship
Gold medal – first place	1963 Romania	Team
Silver medal – second place	1955 Romania	Team
Silver medal – second place	1958 Czechoslovakia	Team
Bronze medal – third place	1971 Italy	Team
Bronze medal – third place	1977 Finland	Team

The Romania men's national volleyball team is governed by the Federaţia Română de Volei and takes part in international volleyball competitions.

== Results ==
=== Olympic Games ===
Champions Runners up Third place Fourth place

Summer Olympics record
Year	Round	Position	Pld	W	L	SW	SL
(Japan) 1964		4th place	9	6	3	19	15
(Mexico) 1968	Did not qualify						
(West Germany) 1972		5th place	7	4	3	14	10
(Canada) 1976	Did not qualify						
(Soviet Union) 1980	Semifinals	3rd place	6	4	2	13	9
(United States) 1984	Did not qualify						
(South Korea) 1988	Did not qualify						
(Spain) 1992	Did not qualify						
(United States) 1996	Did not qualify						
(Australia) 2000	Did not qualify						
(Greece) 2004	Did not qualify						
(China) 2008	Did not qualify						
(United Kingdom) 2012	Did not qualify						
(Brazil) 2016	Did not qualify						
(Japan) 2020	Did not qualify						
(France) 2024	Did not qualify						
(United States) 2028	To be determined						
(Australia) 2032	To be determined						
Total	0 Titles	3/18	22	14	8	46	34

=== World Championship ===
Romania in the FIVB World Championship
Year	Round	Position	Pld	W	L	SW	SL
(Czechoslovakia) 1949		5th place					
(Soviet Union) 1952		4th place					
(France) 1956		2nd place					
(Brazil) 1960		3rd place					
(Soviet Union) 1962		3rd place					
(Czechoslovakia) 1966		2nd place					
(People's Republic of Bulgaria) 1970		7th place					
(Mexico) 1974		6th place					
(Italy) 1978		13th place					
(Argentina) 1982		15th place	9	5	4	18	15
(France) 1986	Did not qualify						
(Brazil) 1990	Did not qualify						
(Greece) 1994	Did not qualify						
(Japan) 1998	Did not qualify						
(Argentina) 2002	Did not qualify						
(Japan) 2006	Did not qualify						
(Italy) 2010	Did not qualify						
(Poland) 2014	Did not qualify						
(Italy) (Bulgaria) 2018	Did not qualify						
(Poland) (Slovenia) 2022	Did not qualify						
(Philippines) 2025	Preliminary round	29th	3	0	3	1	9
(Poland) 2027	To be determined						
(Qatar) 2029	To be determined						
Total	0 Titles	11/23					

=== European Championship ===
Champions Runners up Third place Fourth place

European Championship record
Year	Round	Position	Pld	W	L	SW	SL
(Italy) 1948	Did not enter						
(Bulgaria) 1950		5th Place					
(France) 1951		4th Place					
(Romania) 1955		2nd place					
(Czechoslovakia) 1958		2nd place					
(Romania) 1963		1st place					
(Turkey) 1967		5th place					
(Italy) 1971		3rd place					
(Socialist Federal Republic of Yugoslavia) 1975		4th place					
(Finland) 1977	Semifinals	3rd place					
(France) 1979		7th place					
(Bulgaria) 1981		5th place					
(East Germany) 1983		8th place					
(Netherlands) 1985		8th Place					
(Belgium) 1987		10th Place					
(Sweden) 1989		12th place					
(Germany) 1991	Did not qualify						
(Finland) 1993	Did not qualify						
(Greece) 1995		12th place					
(Netherlands) 1997	Did not qualify						
(Austria) 1999	Did not qualify						
(Czech Republic) 2001	Did not qualify						
(Germany) 2003	Did not qualify						
(Italy) / (Serbia and Montenegro) 2005	Did not qualify						
(Russia) 2007	Did not qualify						
(Turkey) 2009	Did not qualify						
(Austria) / (Czech Republic) 2011	Did not qualify						
(Denmark) / (Poland) 2013	Did not qualify						
(Bulgaria) / (Italy) 2015	Did not qualify						
(Poland) 2017	Did not qualify						
(Belgium) / (France) / (Netherlands) / (Slovenia) 2019		21st place					
(Poland) / (Czech Republic) / (Estonia) / (Finland) 2021	Did not qualify						
(Italy) / (Bulgaria) / (North Macedonia) / (Israel) 2023		7th place					
(Bulgaria) (Finland) (Italy) (Romania) 2026		8th place	7	4	3	15	13
(Montenegro) 2028		To be determined					
Total	1 Title	18/34					

== Players ==
=== Squad for 2023 Men's European Championship ===
- 1. Bela Bartha (Dinamo Bucureşti)
- 2. Mircea Peţa (Steaua Bucureşti)
- 3. Filip Constantin (Rapid Bucureşti)
- 4. Sergio Diaconescu (SCM U Craiova)
- 5. Daniel Chiţigoi (ZAKSA Kędzierzyn-Koźle)
- 6. Claudiu Dumitru (Steaua Bucureşti)
- 7. Rareş Bălean (Dinamo Bucureşti)
- 9. Adrian Aciobăniţei (Skra Bełchatów)
- 11. Karol Kosinski (Rapid Bucureşti)
- 12. Marian Bala (Arcada Galaţi)
- 13. Alexandru Raţă (Tectum Achel)
- 15. Andrei Butnaru (Arcada Galaţi)
- 19. Robert Călin (SCM U Craiova)
- 22. Ştefan Lupu (Corona Braşov)

== See also ==
- Romania women's national volleyball team
