= Volleyball at the 2000 Summer Olympics – Men's European qualification =

The European qualification for the 2000 Men's Olympic Volleyball Tournament was held from 12 June 1999 to 9 January 2000.

== Pre–elimination round ==
- Dates: 12–19 June 1999
- All times are local.
- In case of an aggregate set tie, teams compare an aggregate point to determine the winner.

Team 1	Agg.	Team 2	1st leg	2nd leg
Latvia	6–2	Bosnia and Herzegovina	3–0	3–2
Israel	2–6	Hungary	1–3	1–3
Germany	5–4	Denmark	3–1	2–3
Ukraine	W/O	Sweden		

=== First leg ===
Date	Time		Score		Set 1	Set 2	Set 3	Set 4	Set 5	Total
12 Jun	18:30	Latvia	3–0	Bosnia and Herzegovina	25–21	25–19	25–17			75–57
13 Jun	19:00	Germany	3–1	Denmark	25–17	23–25	25–20	25–19		98–81
13 Jun	20:00	Israel	1–3	Hungary	17–25	25–20	22–25	21–25		85–95

=== Second leg ===
Date	Time		Score		Set 1	Set 2	Set 3	Set 4	Set 5	Total
13 Jun	18:30	Latvia	3–2	Bosnia and Herzegovina	25–21	20–25	25–17	20–25	15–10	105–98
14 Jun	20:00	Germany	2–3	Denmark	25–19	25–22	23–25	21–25	9–15	103–106
19 Jun	18:00	Hungary	3–1	Israel	25–16	19–25	25–21	25–16		94–78

== Elimination round ==
- Dates: 3–12 September 1999
- All times are local.
- In case of an aggregate set tie, teams compare an aggregate point to determine the winner.

Team 1	Agg.	Team 2	1st leg	2nd leg
Turkey	4–4^{1}	Germany	3–1	1–3
Finland	3–4	Spain	3–1	0–3
Slovakia	3–3^{2}	Ukraine	0–3	3–0

^{1} Germany won 181–175 on the aggregate point.
^{2} Slovakia won 135–134 on the aggregate point.

=== First leg ===
Date	Time		Score		Set 1	Set 2	Set 3	Set 4	Set 5	Total
3 Sep	18:00	Slovakia	0–3	Ukraine	22–25	17–25	21–25			60–75
4 Sep	16:00	Turkey	3–1	Germany	22–25	25–15	25–20	25–23		97–83
5 Sep	18:00	Finland	3–1	Spain	20–25	25–22	25–17	25–15		95–79

=== Second leg ===
Date	Time		Score		Set 1	Set 2	Set 3	Set 4	Set 5	Total
4 Sep	18:00	Slovakia	3–0	Ukraine	25–17	25–21	25–21			75–59
12 Sep	13:00	Spain	3–0	Finland	25–23	25–20	25–20			75–63
12 Sep	15:00	Germany	3–1	Turkey	25–14	23–25	25–17	25–22		98–78

== Pre–qualification tournament ==
- Host: Vilvoorde, Belgium
- Dates: 17–21 November 1999
- All times are Central European Time (UTC+01:00).

Pos	Team	Pld	W	L	Pts	SW	SL	SR	SPW	SPL	SPR	Qualification
1	Latvia	4	4	0	8	12	6	2.000	405	383	1.057	Qualification tournament
2	Hungary	4	2	2	6	9	8	1.125	402	397	1.013	
3	Germany	4	2	2	6	9	9	1.000	397	398	0.997	
4	Belgium	4	1	3	5	8	11	0.727	420	429	0.979	
5	Slovakia	4	1	3	5	7	11	0.636	402	419	0.959	

Date	Time		Score		Set 1	Set 2	Set 3	Set 4	Set 5	Total
17 Nov	17:30	Germany	1–3	Latvia	25–23	16–25	21–25	16–25		78–98
17 Nov	20:00	Belgium	1–3	Hungary	30–28	22–25	24–26	20–25		96–104
18 Nov	17:30	Hungary	2–3	Latvia	25–19	29–31	20–25	25–20	8–15	107–110
18 Nov	20:00	Slovakia	3–2	Belgium	25–19	21–25	33–35	25–22	15–10	119–111
19 Nov	17:30	Latvia	3–1	Slovakia	25–23	25–22	21–25	27–25		98–95
19 Nov	20:00	Germany	3–1	Hungary	25–18	26–28	25–23	25–23		101–92
20 Nov	15:00	Belgium	2–3	Latvia	20–25	22–25	25–17	25–17	11–15	103–99
20 Nov	17:30	Slovakia	2–3	Germany	16–25	26–24	25–22	18–25	13–15	98–111
21 Nov	12:00	Hungary	3–1	Slovakia	25–22	24–26	25–19	25–23		99–90
21 Nov	14:30	Germany	2–3	Belgium	19–25	22–25	25–21	25–21	16–18	107–110

== Qualification tournament ==
- Venue: Spodek, Katowice, Poland
- Dates: 3–9 January 2000
- All times are Central European Time (UTC+01:00).

=== Preliminary round ===
Pos	Team	Pld	W	L	Pts	SW	SL	SR	SPW	SPL	SPR	Qualification
1	Yugoslavia	5	5	0	10	15	2	7.500	418	336	1.244	Final
2	Bulgaria	5	3	2	8	11	8	1.375	437	443	0.986	Final
3	Netherlands	5	3	2	8	10	8	1.250	410	389	1.054	
4	Poland	5	3	2	8	11	10	1.100	492	471	1.045	
5	Czech Republic	5	1	4	6	4	14	0.286	381	432	0.882	
6	Latvia	5	0	5	5	6	15	0.400	429	496	0.865	

Date	Time		Score		Set 1	Set 2	Set 3	Set 4	Set 5	Total
3 Jan	15:15	Poland	3–2	Latvia	23–25	25–19	29–31	25–18	15–11	117–104
3 Jan	17:45	Bulgaria	1–3	Yugoslavia	18–25	19–25	25–19	16–25		78–94
3 Jan	20:15	Czech Republic	0–3	Netherlands	17–25	21–25	22–25			60–75
4 Jan	15:15	Poland	1–3	Bulgaria	25–23	21–25	20–25	32–34		98–107
4 Jan	17:45	Yugoslavia	3–0	Czech Republic	29–27	25–20	25–15			79–62
4 Jan	20:30	Latvia	1–3	Netherlands	20–25	19–25	25–22	14–25		78–97
5 Jan	15:15	Czech Republic	1–3	Poland	19–25	20–25	25–20	19–25		83–95
5 Jan	17:45	Bulgaria	3–1	Latvia	25–22	17–25	25–18	27–25		94–90
5 Jan	20:30	Netherlands	0–3	Yugoslavia	20–25	20–25	18–25			58–75
7 Jan	15:15	Bulgaria	3–0	Czech Republic	25–19	25–23	25–21			75–63
7 Jan	17:45	Latvia	0–3	Yugoslavia	11–25	23–25	15–25			49–75
7 Jan	20:15	Poland	3–1	Netherlands	18–25	25–19	25–20	25–18		93–82
8 Jan	11:30	Czech Republic	3–2	Latvia	28–26	25–23	24–26	21–25	15–8	113–108
8 Jan	14:15	Yugoslavia	3–1	Poland	25–19	25–20	18–25	27–25		95–89
8 Jan	17:15	Netherlands	3–1	Bulgaria	25–21	23–25	25–17	25–20		98–83

=== Final ===
Date	Time		Score		Set 1	Set 2	Set 3	Set 4	Set 5	Total
9 Jan	15:00	Yugoslavia	3–0	Bulgaria	25–22	25–13	25–16			75–51

=== Final standing ===
Rank	Team
1	Yugoslavia
2	Bulgaria
3	Netherlands
4	Poland
5	Czech Republic
6	Latvia

Qualified for the 2000 Summer Olympics
