= 2001 Men's European Volleyball Championship qualification =

The qualifying event for the 2001 Men's European Volleyball Championship were played in 2000 and 2001. The number one to six from the 1999 edition of the Men's European Volleyball Championship — Italy, Yugoslavia, Russia, France, Czech Republic (also host) and the Netherlands — were automatically qualified for the 2001 edition. The four group winners qualified, and the two best numbers two.

== Group A ==
Pos	Team	Pld	W	L	Pts	SW	SL	SR	SPW	SPL	SPR
1	Poland	6	5	1	11	17	4	4.250	0	0	—
2	Bulgaria	6	5	1	11	15	8	1.875	0	0	—
3	Belgium	6	2	4	8	10	14	0.714	0	0	—
4	Israel	6	0	6	6	2	18	0.111	0	0	—

Date	Time		Score		Set 1	Set 2	Set 3	Set 4	Set 5	Total	Report
21/05/2000	15:00	Bulgaria	3–1	Belgium	25–20	20–25	25–19	25–20		95–84	
21/05/2000	17:30	Poland	3–0	Israel	25–15	25–17	25–20			75–52	
22/05/2000	15:15	Poland	3–0	Belgium	30–28	28–26	25–18			83–72	
22/05/2000	18:00	Bulgaria	3–0	Israel	25–20	25–19	25–23			75–62	
23/05/2000	15:15	Bulgaria	0–3	Poland	24–26	16–25	15–25			55–76	
23/05/2000	18:00	Belgium	3–2	Israel	20–25	25–27	25–23	25–20	15–13	110–108	
04/05/2001	20:00	Poland	3–0	Israel	25–0	25–0	25–0			75–0	
04/05/2001	17:30	Bulgaria	3–2	Belgium	25–19	21–25	19–25	26–24	15–12	106–105	
05/05/2001	17:30	Bulgaria	3–0	Israel	25–0	25–0	25–0			75–0	
05/05/2001	20:00	Poland	3–1	Belgium	26–24	26–24	25–27	25–13		102–88	
06/05/2001	18:30	Belgium	3–0	Israel	25–0	25–0	25–0			75–0	
06/05/2001	16:00	Bulgaria	3–2	Poland	22–25	18–25	25–15	25–22	16–14	106–101	

== Group B ==
Pos	Team	Pld	W	L	Pts	SW	SL	SR	SPW	SPL	SPR
1	Slovakia	6	5	1	11	15	6	2.500	0	0	—
2	Germany	6	4	2	10	15	10	1.500	0	0	—
3	Spain	6	2	4	8	12	14	0.857	0	0	—
4	Latvia	6	1	5	7	5	17	0.294	0	0	—

• 2000-05-21	Slovakia	3 – 0	Latvia	25-20 25-22 25-22
	Spain	3 – 2	Germany	25-22 21-25 25-17 23-25 19-17
• 2000-05-22	Slovakia	3 – 0	Germany	25-22 22-25 25-19 25-13
	Latvia	3 – 2	Spain	25-23 19-25 26-24 22-25 15-10
• 2000-05-23	Slovakia	3 – 0	Spain	25-17 25-23 25-18
	Germany	3 – 1	Latvia	17-25 25-22 25-23 25-23
• 2001-05-03	Slovakia	3 – 2	Spain	25-17 25-22 24-26 28-30 18-16
	Germany	3 – 1	Latvia	25-17 25-17 25-27 25-19
• 2001-05-04	Slovakia	3 – 0	Latvia	25-23 25-22 25-18
	Germany	3 – 2	Spain	25-17 23-25 25-23 22-25 15-10
• 2001-05-05	Germany	3 – 0	Slovakia	25-16 25-22 25-13
	Spain	3 – 0	Latvia	25-22 25-23 25-20

== Group C ==
Pos	Team	Pld	W	L	Pts	SW	SL	SR	SPW	SPL	SPR
1	Hungary	6	4	2	10	13	10	1.300	0	0	—
2	Greece	6	4	2	10	15	12	1.250	0	0	—
3	Finland	6	3	3	9	12	10	1.200	0	0	—
4	Croatia	6	1	5	7	8	16	0.500	0	0	—

• 2000-05-27	Hungary	3 – 0	Croatia	25-20 25-18 25-17
• 2000-05-28	Greece	3 – 1	Finland	25-23 22-25 25-22 25-18
• 2000-06-03	Finland	3 – 1	Croatia	25-22 17-25 25-20 27-25
• 2000-06-04	Greece	3 – 1	Hungary	27-25 25-17 27-29 25-18
• 2000-06-10	Hungary	3 – 0	Finland	25-21 26-24 25-20
• 2000-06-11	Croatia	3 – 1	Greece	18-25 32-30 26-24 25-21
• 2001-05-04	Hungary	3 – 2	Greece	25-23 25-23 16-25 22-25 15-12
• 2001-05-27	Croatia	0 – 3	Finland	23-25 23-25 23-25
• 2001-06-03	Croatia	2 – 3	Hungary	25-21 20-25 25-19 22-25 09-15
• 2001-06-18	Finland	3 – 0	Hungary	25-23 27-25 25-18
• 2001-06-18	Greece	3 – 2	Croatia	25-21 25-17 27-29 23-25 15-08
• 2001-05-08	Finland	2 – 3	Greece	29-27 25-15 28-30 14-25 09-15

== Group D ==
Pos	Team	Pld	W	L	Pts	SW	SL	SR	SPW	SPL	SPR
1	Slovenia	6	5	1	11	16	6	2.667	0	0	—
2	Turkey	6	4	2	10	13	9	1.444	0	0	—
3	Portugal	6	3	3	9	12	10	1.200	0	0	—
4	Bosnia and H.	6	0	6	6	2	18	0.111	0	0	—

• 2000-05-27	Portugal	3 – 0	Bosnia & H.	25-20 25-23 25-21
• 2000-05-27	Turkey	1 – 3	Slovenia	23-25 25-22 17-25 27-29
• 2000-06-03	Bosnia & H.	0 – 3	Slovenia	21-25 17-25 31-33
• 2000-06-03	Portugal	3 – 0	Turkey	27-25 25-17 25-18
• 2000-06-09	Turkey	3 – 1	Bosnia & H.	25-18 25-13 20-25 25-20
• 2000-06-10	Slovenia	3 – 0	Portugal	25-20 28-26 25-22
• 2000-06-17	Bosnia & H.	0 – 3	Turkey	17-25 20-25 19-25
• 2000-06-17	Portugal	2 – 3	Slovenia	25-22 25-20 23-25 18-25 15-17
• 2001-04-28	Turkey	3 – 1	Portugal	25-16 25-21 26-28 28-26
• 2001-05-01	Bosnia & H.	1 – 3	Portugal	22-25 23-25 25-20 19-25
• 2001-05-26	Slovenia	3 – 1	Bosnia & H.	25-16 25-22 25-15
• 2001-06-02	Slovenia	1 – 3	Turkey	25-19 18-25 18-25 19-25
