= Czech Republic men's national volleyball team =

Men's national volleyball team representing the Czech Republic

Czech Republic
- Nickname(s): Nároďák (The National Team)
- Association: Czech Volleyball Federation (CVF)
- Confederation: CEV
- Head coach: Jiří Novák
- FIVB ranking: NR (3 August 2026)

Uniforms
Home	Away	Third

World Championship
- Appearances: 9 (First in 1998)
- Best result: 4th (2025)

European Championship
- Appearances: 14 (First in 1995)
- Best result: 4th (1999, 2001)
- www.cvf.cz (in Czech)
Honours
Medal record
Challenger Cup
Silver medal – second place	2018 Matosinhos	Team
European League
Gold medal – first place	2004 Opava	Team
Gold medal – first place	2022 Varaždin	Team
Silver medal – second place	2025 Brno	Team
Bronze medal – third place	2024 Osijek	Team

The Czech Republic national men's volleyball team is controlled by the Czech Volleyball Federation, which represents the country in international competitions and friendly matches. Czech Republic is ranked 22nd (as of January 2023) in the FIVB world ranking.

FIVB considers Czech Republic as the inheritor of the records of Czechoslovakia (1948–1993). The Czech team’s first participations in international competitions saw them win a gold medal at the inaugural European Championship in 1948 which kick-started a golden age for the team. They won two more European in 1955 and 1958, two golds at the World Championships of 1956 and 1966, and a further eight medals in other elite tournaments. They took silver at the Tokyo 1964 Olympic Games and followed that with the bronze four years later in Mexico City.

== Competition record ==
=== Olympic Games ===
Olympic Games record
Year	Round	Position	GP	MW	ML	SW	SL	Squad
as Czechoslovakia
(Japan) 1964	Round robin	2nd	9	8	1	26	10	Squad
(Mexico) 1968	Round robin	3rd	9	7	2	22	21	Squad
(Germany) 1972	5th place match	6th	7	4	3	15	9	Squad
(Canada) 1976	5th place match	5th	6	4	2	14	8	Squad
(Soviet Union) 1980	7th place match	8th	6	1	5	7	17	Squad
(United States) 1984	Did not qualify							
(South Korea) 1988	Did not qualify							
(Spain) 1992	Did not qualify							
as Czech Republic
(United States) 1996	Did not qualify							
(Australia) 2000	Did not qualify							
(Greece) 2004	Did not qualify							
(China) 2008	Did not qualify							
(United Kingdom) 2012	Did not qualify							
(Brazil) 2016	Did not qualify							
(Japan) 2020	Did not qualify							
(France) 2024	Did not qualify							

=== World Championship ===
World Championship record
Year	Round	Position	GP	MW	ML	SW	SL
as Czechoslovakia
(Czechoslovakia) 1949	Final group	2nd	7	6	1	19	3
(Soviet Union) 1952	Final group	2nd	7	6	1	18	7
(France) 1956	Final group	1st	10	10	0	30	7
(Brazil) 1960	Final group	2nd	11	10	1	30	8
(Soviet Union) 1962	Final group	2nd	10	12	2	31	16
(Czechoslovakia) 1966	Final group	1st	12	11	1	35	12
(Bulgaria) 1970	Final group	4th	12	9	3	28	13
(Mexico) 1974	5th place match	5th	8	4	4	17	16
(Italy) 1978	5th place match	5th	10	6	4	25	17
(Argentina) 1982	9th place match	9th	10	6	4	23	14
(France) 1986	7th place match	8th	10	3	7	10	21
(Brazil) 1990	9th place match	9th	6	3	3	11	13
as Czech Republic
(Greece) 1994	Did not qualify						
(Japan) 1998	Preliminary round	19th	3	0	3	1	9
(Argentina) 2002	Second round	13th	6	1	5	9	17
(Japan) 2006	Second round	13th	12	3	9	14	28
(Italy) 2010	9th place match	10th	9	5	4	20	14
(Poland) 2014	Did not qualify						
(Italy) (Bulgaria) 2018	Did not qualify						
(Poland) (Slovenia) 2022	Did not qualify						
(Philippines) 2025	Semifinals	4th	7	4	3	14	10
(Poland) 2027	Future event						
(Qatar) 2029	Future event						

=== World Cup ===
- 1965 Poland — Bronze medal Czechoslovakia
- 1969 East Germany — 5th place Czechoslovakia
- 1985 Japan — Bronze medal Czechoslovakia

=== World League ===
- (Spain) 2003 Madrid — 4th place
- (Italy) 2014 Florence — 16th place
- (Brazil) 2015 Rio de Janeiro — 15th place
- (Poland) 2016 Kraków — 18th place
- (Brazil) 2017 Curitiba — 20th place

=== Challenger Cup ===
- (Portugal) 2018 Matosinhos – Silver medal
- (South Korea) 2022 Seoul – 4th place

=== European Championship ===
- 1948 Italy — Gold medal Czechoslovakia
- 1950 Bulgaria — Silver medal Czechoslovakia
- 1955 Romania — Gold medal Czechoslovakia
- 1958 Czechoslovakia — Gold medal Czechoslovakia
- 1963 Romania — 5th place Czechoslovakia
- 1967 Turkey — Silver medal Czechoslovakia
- 1971 Italy — Silver medal Czechoslovakia
- (Socialist Federal Republic of Yugoslavia) 1975 Yugoslavia — 6th place Czechoslovakia
- 1977 Finland — 6th place Czechoslovakia
- 1979 France — 6th place Czechoslovakia
- 1981 Bulgaria — 4th place Czechoslovakia
- 1983 East Germany — 5th place Czechoslovakia
- 1985 Netherlands — Silver medal Czechoslovakia
- 1987 Belgium — 6th place Czechoslovakia
- 1991 Germany — 12th place Czechoslovakia
- 1993 Finland — 8th place Czechoslovakia
- 1995 Greece — 10th place
- 1997 Netherlands — 6th place
- 1999 Austria — 4th place
- 2001 Czech Republic — 4th place
- 2003 Germany — 9th place
- 2005 Italy/Serbia and Montenegro — 9th place
- 2009 Turkey — 16th place
- 2011 Austria/Czech Republic — 10th place
- 2013 Denmark/Poland — 16th place
- 2015 Bulgaria/Italy — 13th place
- 2017 Poland — 7th place
- 2019 France/Slovenia/Belgium/Netherlands — 13th place
- 2021 Poland/Czech Republic/Estonia/Finland — 8th place
- 2023 Italy/Bulgaria/North Macedonia/Israel — 12th place
- 2026 Italy/Bulgaria/Finland/Romania — 12th place
- 2028 Montenegro — To be determined

=== European League ===
- (Czech Republic) 2004 Opava – Gold medal
- (Russia) 2005 Kazan – 7th place
- (Portugal) 2007 Portimão – 9th place
- (Turkey) 2012 Ankara – 5th place
- (Turkey) 2013 Marmaris – Bronze medal
- (Czech Republic) 2018 Karlovy Vary – Silver medal
- (Estonia) 2019 Tallinn – 8th place
- (Belgium) 2021 Kortrijk – 7th place
- (Croatia) 2022 Varaždin – Gold medal
- (Croatia) 2023 Zadar – 4th place
- (Croatia) 2024 Osijek – Bronze medal
- (Czech Republic) 2025 Brno – Silver medal
- (Finland) / (Netherlands) 2026 – 7th place

== Current squad ==
The following is the Czech roster in the 2021 Men's European Volleyball Championship.

Head coach:	Jiří Novák
Assistants:	Martin Kop, Stefano Mascia, Fulvio Bertini, Petr Benda

No.	Name	Date of birth	Height	Weight	Spike	Block	2021/22 club
1	Milan Moník	15 March 1988	1.90 m (6 ft 3 in)	86 kg (190 lb)	336 cm (132 in)	305 cm (120 in)	(Czech Republic) VK Lvi Praha
2	Jan Hadrava	3 June 1991	1.98 m (6 ft 6 in)	101 kg (223 lb)	357 cm (141 in)	335 cm (132 in)	(Poland) Jastrzębski Węgiel
3	Daniel Pfeffer	27 April 1990	1.84 m (6 ft 0 in)	80 kg (180 lb)	331 cm (130 in)	322 cm (127 in)	(Czech Republic) VK Karlovarsko
5	Adam Zajíček	25 February 1993	2.01 m (6 ft 7 in)	92 kg (203 lb)	345 cm (136 in)	331 cm (130 in)	(Czech Republic) VK Karlovarsko
6	Michal Finger	2 September 1993	2.02 m (6 ft 8 in)	93 kg (205 lb)	366 cm (144 in)	342 cm (135 in)	(Qatar) Al-Rayyan SC
9	Vojtěch Patočka	2 March 1993	1.97 m (6 ft 6 in)	94 kg (207 lb)	345 cm (136 in)	330 cm (130 in)	(Czech Republic) VK Karlovarsko
12	Martin Licek	5 January 1995	1.97 m (6 ft 6 in)	83 kg (183 lb)	337 cm (133 in)	320 cm (130 in)	(Czech Republic) České Budějovice
13	Jan Galabov	12 June 1996	1.93 m (6 ft 4 in)	89 kg (196 lb)	354 cm (139 in)	320 cm (130 in)	(Poland) BKS Visła Bydgoszcz
14	Adam Bartoš	27 April 1992	1.98 m (6 ft 6 in)	89 kg (196 lb)	350 cm (140 in)	330 cm (130 in)	(France) Nantes Rezé Métropole
15	Lukáš Vašina	6 July 1999	1.98 m (6 ft 6 in)	87 kg (192 lb)	350 cm (140 in)	340 cm (130 in)	(Czech Republic) VK Karlovarsko
18	Jakub Janouch (C)	13 June 1990	1.94 m (6 ft 4 in)	88 kg (194 lb)	335 cm (132 in)	325 cm (128 in)	(Czech Republic) VK Lvi Praha
19	Luboš Bartůněk	24 May 1990	1.94 m (6 ft 4 in)	80 kg (180 lb)	332 cm (131 in)	303 cm (119 in)	(Czech Republic) VK Dukla Liberec
22	Oliver Sedláček	27 April 1998	2.01 m (6 ft 7 in)	92 kg (203 lb)	358 cm (141 in)	342 cm (135 in)	(Czech Republic) České Budějovice
25	Josef Polák	11 February 1999	2.01 m (6 ft 7 in)	78 kg (172 lb)	344 cm (135 in)	333 cm (131 in)	(Czech Republic) České Budějovice

== Kit providers ==
The table below shows the history of kit providers for the Czech national volleyball team.

Period	Kit provider
2002–	Adidas

=== Sponsorship ===
Primary sponsors include: main sponsors like UNIQA other sponsors: Czech Tourism, Moser, iDNES, Cedok and Rimowa.

== See also ==
- Czech Republic women's national volleyball team
