= Austria men's national volleyball team =

Men's volleyball team

Austria
- Association: Österreichischer Volleyball Verband
- Confederation: CEV
- Head coach: Adam Swaczyna

Uniforms
Home	Away
- Website

The Austria men's national volleyball team represents Austria in international men's volleyball competitions and friendly matches.

== World Championship ==
Year	Position
(France) 1956	20th
(Soviet Union) 1962	19th
Total	2/18

== World League ==
Year	Position
(Brazil) 2017	29th
Total	1/28

== European Championship ==
Year	Position
(Romania) 1955	13th
(Czechoslovakia) 1958	18th
(Romania) 1963	16th
(Turkey) 1967	19th
(Italy) 1971	21st
(Austria) 1999	8th
(Austria) / (Czech Republic) 2011	16th
Total	7/29

== European League ==
Year	Position
(Turkey) 2008	7th
(Portugal) 2009	10th
(Spain) 2010	10th
(Slovakia) 2011	12th
(Turkey) 2012	8th
(Turkey) 2013	9th
2014	5th
(Poland) 2015	10th
(Bulgaria) 2016	3rd place, bronze medalist(s)
(Czech Republic) 2018	17th
(Estonia) 2019	15th
(Belgium) 2021	16th
(Croatia) 2024	14th
(Czech Republic) 2025	16th
(Finland) (Netherlands) 2026	18th
Total	15/22

== Current squad ==
The following is the Austrian roster in the 2017 World League.

Head coach: Michael Warm

No.	Name	Date of birth	Height	Weight	Spike	Block	2016–17 club
1	Philipp Kroiss	2 March 1988	1.84 m (6 ft 0 in)	82 kg (181 lb)	325 cm (128 in)	310 cm (120 in)	(Belgium) Euphony Asse-Lennik
3	Peter Wohlfahrtstätter (C)	10 March 1989	2.03 m (6 ft 8 in)	92 kg (203 lb)	348 cm (137 in)	331 cm (130 in)	(Poland) Effector Kielce
5	Thomas Tröthann	4 May 1992	2.03 m (6 ft 8 in)	98 kg (216 lb)	345 cm (136 in)	328 cm (129 in)	(Austria) Amstetten NÖ/hotVolleys
6	Anton Menner	25 July 1994	1.94 m (6 ft 4 in)	90 kg (200 lb)	340 cm (130 in)	324 cm (128 in)	(Austria) Aich-Dob
7	Lorenz Koraimann	7 May 1993	2.01 m (6 ft 7 in)	88 kg (194 lb)	345 cm (136 in)	330 cm (130 in)	(Austria) Holding Graz
8	Alexander Tusch	19 November 1992	1.89 m (6 ft 2 in)	81 kg (179 lb)	330 cm (130 in)	314 cm (124 in)	(Austria) Hypo Tirol Innsbruck
9	Thomas Zass	27 November 1989	1.93 m (6 ft 4 in)	90 kg (200 lb)	352 cm (139 in)	335 cm (132 in)	(France) Cannes
10	Fabian Kriener	31 December 1995	1.94 m (6 ft 4 in)	80 kg (180 lb)	340 cm (130 in)	325 cm (128 in)	(Austria) Amstetten NÖ/hotVolleys
12	Alexander Berger	27 September 1988	1.94 m (6 ft 4 in)	85 kg (187 lb)	351 cm (138 in)	334 cm (131 in)	(Italy) Sir Sicoma Colussi Perugia
13	Maximilian Thaller	13 December 1993	1.88 m (6 ft 2 in)	82 kg (181 lb)	325 cm (128 in)	315 cm (124 in)	(Austria) Aich-Dob
14	Florian Ringseis	9 July 1992	1.90 m (6 ft 3 in)	86 kg (190 lb)	325 cm (128 in)	310 cm (120 in)	(Germany) United Volleys Rhein-Main
15	Nicolai Grabmüller	18 April 1996	1.99 m (6 ft 6 in)	99 kg (218 lb)	335 cm (132 in)	320 cm (130 in)	(Germany) Herrsching
16	Clemens Unterberger	22 February 1994	1.94 m (6 ft 4 in)	88 kg (194 lb)	345 cm (136 in)	328 cm (129 in)	(Austria) Holding Graz
17	Mathäus Jurkovics	27 April 1998	2.08 m (6 ft 10 in)	85 kg (187 lb)	340 cm (130 in)	325 cm (128 in)	(Austria) Amstetten NÖ/hotVolleys
18	Paul Buchegger	4 March 1996	2.05 m (6 ft 9 in)	103 kg (227 lb)	345 cm (136 in)	330 cm (130 in)	(Italy) Sieco Service Ortona
19	Fabian Michael Schmiedbauer	22 April 1998	2.07 m (6 ft 9 in)	90 kg (200 lb)	340 cm (130 in)	320 cm (130 in)	(Austria) MusGym Salzburg
20	David Michel	27 October 1996	1.95 m (6 ft 5 in)	85 kg (187 lb)	347 cm (137 in)	330 cm (130 in)	(Poland) Ślepsk Suwałki
21	Alexander Harthaller	17 August 1994	2.00 m (6 ft 7 in)	92 kg (203 lb)	335 cm (132 in)	320 cm (130 in)	(United States) Pepperdine University
