= Daniel Pfeffer =

Czech volleyball player (born 1990)

Personal information
- Nationality: Czech
- Born: 27 April 1990 (age 36); Prague, Czech Republic
- Height: 1.84 m (6 ft 0 in)
- Weight: 80 kg (176 lb)
- Spike: 331 cm (130 in)
- Block: 322 cm (127 in)

Volleyball information
- Position: Libero
- Current club: VK Karlovarsko
- Number: 3

Career
| Years | Teams |
|---|---|
| 2015– | VK Karlovarsko |

National team
| 2015– | Czech Republic |
Honours
Men's volleyball
Representing Czech Republic
European League
| Gold medal – first place | 2021 Croatia |

Daniel Pfeffer (born 27 April 1990) is a Czech male volleyball player. He is part of the Czech Republic men's national volleyball team. On club level he plays for VK Karlovarsko.
