= Nicolai Grabmüller =

Austrian volleyball player (born 1996)

Personal information
- Nationality: Austrian
- Born: 18 April 1996 (age 30); Henndorf am Wallersee
- Height: 2.00 cm (1 in)

Volleyball information
- Position: Middle blocker
- Current club: (Austria) Hypo Tirol Innsbruck
- Number: 17

Career
Years	Teams
2013-2014; 2014-2016; 2016-2018; 2018-	(Austria) SG VC MusGym Salzburg (Austria) UVC Holding Graz (Germany) TSV Herrsching (Austria) SK Zadruga AICH/DOB

Nicolai Grabmüller (born 18 April 1996) is an Austrian volleyball player, a member of the club Hypo Tirol Innsbruck in the Austrian Volley League.

== Sporting achievements ==
=== Clubs ===
MEVZA:

- 2019

Austria Championship:

- 2019

=== National team ===
European League:

- 2016
