= 2024 Men's European Volleyball League =

- Dates: 17 May – 16 June
- Teams: 16

The 2024 Men's European Volleyball League was the 20th edition of the annual Men's European Volleyball League, which featured men's national volleyball teams from 16 European countries. This season undergone a new format.

The winners and runners-up qualified for the 2024 Challenger Cup.

The tournament had two divisions: the Golden League, which featured 12 teams, and the Silver League, which featured 4 teams.

== Format changes ==
The CEV announced a change to the format starting this season after a decision was made by the CEV Board of Administration on 16 September 2023 in Rome. Starting this season, the CEV adjusted the format similar to FIVB Volleyball Nations League. This format change was made with consultation with the participating nations to reduce costs.

== Pools composition ==
Teams were seeded according to their European Ranking for national teams as of 9 October 2023. Rankings are shown in brackets.

List of teams in the 2024 Men's European Volleyball League: Participating in 2024 FIVB Men's Volleyball Nations League Participating in Golden League Participating in Silver League Team banned from competition Did not enter

=== Golden League ===
The numbers in brackets indicated their CEV rankings.

League phase
Ukraine (9)
Belgium (11)
Portugal (12)
Czech Republic (13)
Romania (14)
Finland (15)
Croatia (16)
Spain (17)
North Macedonia (21)
Estonia (23)
Luxembourg (25)
Azerbaijan (26)

=== Silver League ===
League phase
Austria (29)
Israel (34)
Faroe Islands (36)
Iceland (38)

== Golden League ==
2024 Men's European Volleyball League

Tournament details
- Host country: Croatia (final four)
- Dates: 17 May – 16 June
- Teams: 12
- Runners-up: Croatia
- Third place: Czech Republic
- Fourth place: Estonia

Tournament awards
- MVP: (Ukraine) Yevhenii Kisiliuk

Tournament statistics
- Matches played: 40

=== Schedule ===
The schedule was as follows:

Round	Round date
Week 1	17–19 May 2024
Week 2	24–26 May 2024
Week 3	30 May – 2 June 2024
Final four	15–16 June 2024

=== Tournament schedule ===
Week 1
Tournament 1 (Azerbaijan) Baku	Tournament 2 (North Macedonia) Strumica	Tournament 3 (Finland) Tampere	Tournament 4 (Portugal) Loulé
Azerbaijan (12) (H); Ukraine (1); Romania (5)	North Macedonia (9) (H); Czech Republic (4); Estonia (10)	Finland (6) (H); Belgium (2); Croatia (7)	Portugal (3) (H); Spain (8); Luxembourg (11)
Week 2
Tournament 5 Luxembourg	Tournament 6 (Spain) Gijón	Tournament 7 (Romania) Râmnicu Vâlcea	Tournament 8 (Belgium) Beveren
Luxembourg (11) (H); Ukraine (1); Czech Republic (4)	Spain (8) (H); Finland (6); Estonia (10)	Romania (5) (H); Portugal (3); Croatia (7)	Belgium (2) (H); North Macedonia (9); Azerbaijan (12)
Week 3
Tournament 9 (Estonia) Rakvere	Tournament 10 (Croatia) Osijek	Tournament 11 (Czech Republic) Karlovy Vary	Tournament 12 (Poland) Tarnów (Note: Due to the Russian invasion of Ukraine, Ukraine's tournament was held at a neutral venue.)
Estonia (10) (H); Luxembourg (11); Azerbaijan (12)	Croatia (7) (H); Spain (8); North Macedonia (9)	Czech Republic (4) (H); Romania (5); Finland (6)	Ukraine (1) (H); Belgium (2); Portugal (3)

=== Tiebreaker ===
1. Total number of victories (matches won, matches lost)
2. In the event of a tie, the following first tiebreaker will apply: The teams will be ranked by the most point gained per match as follows:
  - Match won 3–0 or 3–1: 3 points for the winner, 0 points for the loser
  - Match won 3–2: 2 points for the winner, 1 point for the loser
  - Match forfeited: 3 points for the winner, 0 points (0–25, 0–25, 0–25) for the loser
3. If teams are still tied after examining the number of victories and points gained, then the FIVB will examine the results in order to break the tie in the following order:
  - Set quotient: if two or more teams are tied on the number of points gained, they will be ranked by the quotient resulting from the division of the number of all set won by the number of all sets lost.
  - Points quotient: if the tie persists based on the set quotient, the teams will be ranked by the quotient resulting from the division of all points scored by the total of points lost during all sets.
  - If the tie persists based on the point quotient, the tie will be broken based on the team that won the match of the Round Robin Phase between the tied teams. When the tie in point quotient is between three or more teams, these teams ranked taking into consideration only the matches involving the teams in question.

=== League round ===
- All times are local.

Pos	Team	Pld	W	L	Pts	SW	SL	SR	SPW	SPL	SPR	Qualification or relegation
1	Croatia (Note: Qualified as final four host)	6	6	0	17	18	6	3.000	582	554	1.051	Golden League Final four
2	Czech Republic	6	5	1	15	17	6	2.833	547	456	1.200	Golden League Final four
3	Ukraine	6	4	2	13	15	8	1.875	527	485	1.087	Golden League Final four
4	Estonia	6	4	2	11	13	9	1.444	502	463	1.084	Golden League Final four
5	Belgium	6	4	2	9	13	12	1.083	563	544	1.035	
6	Spain	6	3	3	10	12	11	1.091	552	542	1.018	
7	Finland	6	3	3	9	13	12	1.083	572	563	1.016	
8	Portugal	6	3	3	9	13	12	1.083	572	568	1.007	
9	Romania	6	2	4	7	12	14	0.857	577	565	1.021	
10	North Macedonia	6	1	5	5	9	15	0.600	525	538	0.976	
11	Luxembourg	6	1	5	2	3	17	0.176	361	473	0.763	
12	Azerbaijan	6	0	6	1	2	18	0.111	354	483	0.733	Relegation to Silver League

Source: CEV

==== Week 1 ====
===== Tournament 1 =====
- Venue: Heydar Aliyev Sports and Concert Complex, Baku, Azerbaijan

Date	Time		Score		Set 1	Set 2	Set 3	Set 4	Set 5	Total	Report
17 May	18:00	Romania	3–0	Azerbaijan	25–16	25–16	25–19			75–51	Report
18 May	18:00	Ukraine	3–1	Romania	20–25	25–21	25–23	25–19		95–88	Report
19 May	18:00	Azerbaijan	0–3	Ukraine	16–25	16–25	23–25			55–75	Report

===== Tournament 2 =====
- Venue: Arena Park Sports Hall, Strumica, North Macedonia

Date	Time		Score		Set 1	Set 2	Set 3	Set 4	Set 5	Total	Report
17 May	20:15	Estonia	3–1	North Macedonia	25–23	14–25	25–19	25–22		89–89	Report
18 May	20:15	Czech Republic	3–0	Estonia	25–22	25–20	25–16			75–58	Report
19 May	20:15	North Macedonia	0–3	Czech Republic	16–25	15–25	16–25			47–75	Report

===== Tournament 3 =====
- Venue: Hakametsä Arena, Tampere, Finland

Date	Time		Score		Set 1	Set 2	Set 3	Set 4	Set 5	Total	Report
17 May	19:30	Croatia	3–1	Finland	21–25	26–24	25–15	25–22		97–86	Report
18 May	18:00	Belgium	1–3	Croatia	25–21	24–26	22–25	24–26		95–98	Report
19 May	17:00	Finland	3–0	Belgium	25–23	25–17	26–24			76–64	Report

===== Tournament 4 =====
- Venue: Pavilhão Municipal Professor Joaquim Vairinhos, Loulé, Portugal

Date	Time		Score		Set 1	Set 2	Set 3	Set 4	Set 5	Total	Report
17 May	21:00	Luxembourg	0–3	Portugal	22–25	19–25	16–25			57–75	Report
18 May	17:00	Spain	3–0	Luxembourg	25–15	25–17	25–21			75–53	Report
19 May	16:00	Portugal	3–1	Spain	23–25	25–21	25–22	35–33		108–101	Report

==== Week 2 ====
===== Tournament 5 =====
- Venue: d'Coque, Luxembourg City, Luxembourg

Date	Time		Score		Set 1	Set 2	Set 3	Set 4	Set 5	Total	Report
24 May	20:30	Czech Republic	3–0	Luxembourg	25–17	25–13	25–22			75–52	Report
25 May	20:30	Ukraine	1–3	Czech Republic	22–25	25–23	15–25	22–25		84–98	Report
26 May	18:30	Luxembourg	0–3	Ukraine	16–25	19–25	20–25			55–75	Report

===== Tournament 6 =====
- Venue: Palacio de Deportes de Gijón, Gijón, Spain

Date	Time		Score		Set 1	Set 2	Set 3	Set 4	Set 5	Total	Report
24 May	20:00	Estonia	3–2	Spain	25–22	23–25	31–29	25–27	18–16	122–119	Report
25 May	17:00	Finland	3–1	Estonia	23–25	25–21	25–19	25–18		98–83	Report
26 May	12:00	Spain	3–1	Finland	25–21	19–25	26–24	25–21		95–91	Report

===== Tournament 7 =====
- Venue: Traian Sports Hall, Râmnicu Vâlcea, Romania

Date	Time		Score		Set 1	Set 2	Set 3	Set 4	Set 5	Total	Report
24 May	19:30	Croatia	3–1	Romania	25–23	25–22	20–25	25–22		95–92	Report
25 May	19:30	Portugal	1–3	Croatia	24–26	22–25	25–22	22–25		93–98	Report
26 May	19:30	Romania	2–3	Portugal	23–25	25–22	25–16	22–25	12–15	107–103	Report

===== Tournament 8 =====
- Venue: Topsporthal, Beveren, Belgium

Date	Time		Score		Set 1	Set 2	Set 3	Set 4	Set 5	Total	Report
24 May	17:30	Azerbaijan	0–3	Belgium	19–25	16–25	17–25			52–75	Report
25 May	17:30	North Macedonia	3–0	Azerbaijan	25–17	25–17	25–18			75–52	Report
26 May	15:00	Belgium	3–2	North Macedonia	25–22	22–25	25–17	24–26	17–15	113–105	Report

==== Week 3 ====
===== Tournament 9 =====
- Venue: Rakvere Sports Hall, Rakvere, Estonia

Date	Time		Score		Set 1	Set 2	Set 3	Set 4	Set 5	Total	Report
31 May	18:00	Azerbaijan	0–3	Estonia	14–25	15–25	17–25			46–75	Report
1 Jun	16:00	Luxembourg	3–2	Azerbaijan	25–20	22–25	21–25	25–17	15–11	108–98	Report
2 Jun	17:00	Estonia	3–0	Luxembourg	25–9	25–16	25–11			75–36	Report

===== Tournament 10 =====
- Venue: Gradski vrt Hall Smaller Hall, Osijek, Croatia

Date	Time		Score		Set 1	Set 2	Set 3	Set 4	Set 5	Total	Report
31 May	19:00	North Macedonia	2–3	Croatia	31–33	25–17	29–27	21–25	12–15	118–117	Report
1 Jun	19:00	Spain	3–1	North Macedonia	17–25	25–22	25–22	25–22		92–91	Report
2 Jun	19:00	Croatia	3–0	Spain	27–25	25–22	25–23			77–70	Report

===== Tournament 11 =====
- Venue: Sport Hall for Indoor Games, Karlovy Vary, Czech Republic

Date	Time		Score		Set 1	Set 2	Set 3	Set 4	Set 5	Total	Report
30 May	17:30	Finland	3–2	Czech Republic	16–25	25–23	30–32	25–22	15–11	111–113	Report
31 May	17:00	Romania	3–2	Finland	23–25	21–25	26–24	26–24	15–12	111–110	Report
1 Jun	15:30	Czech Republic	3–2	Romania	24–26	25–20	22–25	25–20	15–13	111–104	Report

===== Tournament 12 =====
- Venue: Arena Jaskółka, Tarnów, Poland

Date	Time		Score		Set 1	Set 2	Set 3	Set 4	Set 5	Total	Report
31 May	20:00	Portugal	1–3	Ukraine	16–25	25–17	22–25	23–25		86–92	Report
1 Jun	20:00	Belgium	3–2	Portugal	25–22	29–31	19–25	25–18	15–11	113–107	Report
2 Jun	20:00	Ukraine	2–3	Belgium	20–25	25–15	25–21	25–27	11–15	106–103	Report

=== Results by round ===
The table listed the results of teams in each round.

Win	Loss

Team ╲ Round	1	2	3	4	5	6
Ukraine	W	W	L	W	W	L
Belgium	L	L	W	W	W	W
Portugal	W	W	L	W	L	L
Czech Republic	W	W	W	W	L	W
Romania	W	L	L	L	W	L
Finland	L	W	W	L	W	L
Croatia	W	W	W	W	W	W
Spain	W	L	L	W	W	L
North Macedonia	L	L	W	L	L	L
Estonia	W	L	W	L	W	W
Luxembourg	L	L	L	L	W	L
Azerbaijan	L	L	L	L	L	L

Source: CEV

=== Final four ===
The Final four was held in Croatia.

Semifinals
15 June
Croatia	3
Estonia	2
15 June
Czech Republic	0
Ukraine	3

Final
16 June
Croatia	1
Ukraine	3
3rd place match
16 June
Estonia	2
Czech Republic	3

==== Semifinals ====
Date	Time		Score		Set 1	Set 2	Set 3	Set 4	Set 5	Total	Report
15 Jun	16:00	Croatia	3–2	Estonia	25–20	24–26	25–21	19–25	15–13	108–105	Report
15 Jun	19:00	Czech Republic	0–3	Ukraine	24–26	16–25	20–25			60–76	Report

==== 3rd place match ====
Date	Time		Score		Set 1	Set 2	Set 3	Set 4	Set 5	Total	Report
16 Jun	16:00	Estonia	2–3	Czech Republic	25–20	22–25	33–31	25–27	12–15	117–118	Report

==== Final ====
Date	Time		Score		Set 1	Set 2	Set 3	Set 4	Set 5	Total	Report
16 Jun	19:00	Croatia	1–3	Ukraine	25–23	19–25	26–28	19–25		89–101	Report

== Silver League ==
2024 Men's European Volleyball League

Tournament details
- Host country: Austria (final)
- Dates: 17 May – 13 June
- Teams: 4
- Runners-up: Austria
- Third place: Faroe Islands
- Fourth place: Iceland

Tournament statistics
- Matches played: 13

=== Schedule ===
The schedule was as follows:

Round	Round date
Week 1	17–19 May 2024
Week 2	24–26 May 2024
Week 3	31 May – 2 June 2024
Week 4	7–9 June 2024
Final	13 June 2024

=== Tournament schedule ===
Week 1	Week 2	Week 3	Week 4
Tournament 1 (Iceland) Kópavogur	Tournament 2 (Faroe Islands) Tórshavn	Tournament 3 (North Macedonia) Strumica (Note: Due to security reasons, Israel's tournament was held at a neutral venue.)	Tournament 4 (Austria) Amstetten
Iceland (4) (H); Israel (2); Faroe Islands (3)	Faroe Islands (3) (H); Austria (1); Iceland (4)	Israel (2) (H); Austria (1); Iceland (4)	Austria (1) (H); Israel (2); Faroe Islands (3)

=== Tiebreaker ===
1. Total number of victories (matches won, matches lost)
2. In the event of a tie, the following first tiebreaker will apply: The teams will be ranked by the most point gained per match as follows:
  - Match won 3–0 or 3–1: 3 points for the winner, 0 points for the loser
  - Match won 3–2: 2 points for the winner, 1 point for the loser
  - Match forfeited: 3 points for the winner, 0 points (0–25, 0–25, 0–25) for the loser
3. If teams are still tied after examining the number of victories and points gained, then the FIVB will examine the results in order to break the tie in the following order:
  - Set quotient: if two or more teams are tied on the number of points gained, they will be ranked by the quotient resulting from the division of the number of all set won by the number of all sets lost.
  - Points quotient: if the tie persists based on the set quotient, the teams will be ranked by the quotient resulting from the division of all points scored by the total of points lost during all sets.
  - If the tie persists based on the point quotient, the tie will be broken based on the team that won the match of the Round Robin Phase between the tied teams. When the tie in point quotient is between three or more teams, these teams ranked taking into consideration only the matches involving the teams in question.

=== League round ===
- All times are local.

Pos	Team	Pld	W	L	Pts	SW	SL	SR	SPW	SPL	SPR	Qualification
1	Israel	6	6	0	17	18	2	9.000	490	320	1.531	Silver League Final
2	Austria	6	4	2	13	14	6	2.333	472	404	1.168	Silver League Final
3	Faroe Islands	6	1	5	3	4	15	0.267	341	467	0.730	
4	Iceland	6	1	5	3	3	16	0.188	367	479	0.766	

Source: CEV

==== Week 1 ====
===== Tournament 1 =====
- Venue: Digranes Sports Hall, Kópavogur, Iceland

Date	Time		Score		Set 1	Set 2	Set 3	Set 4	Set 5	Total	Report
17 May	20:00	Faroe Islands	1–3	Iceland	21–25	26–24	22–25	25–27		94–101	Report
18 May	16:00	Israel	3–0	Faroe Islands	25–11	25–12	25–13			75–36	Report
19 May	15:00	Iceland	0–3	Israel	15–25	11–25	12–25			38–75	Report

==== Week 2 ====
===== Tournament 2 =====
- Venue: Ittrottar - og Samkomuholl Hall, Tórshavn, Faroe Islands

Date	Time		Score		Set 1	Set 2	Set 3	Set 4	Set 5	Total	Report
24 May	19:00	Iceland	0–3	Faroe Islands	24–26	23–25	19–25			66–76	Report
25 May	17:00	Austria	3–0	Iceland	25–20	25–23	25–19			75–62	Report
26 May	17:00	Faroe Islands	0–3	Austria	18–25	16–25	13–25			47–75	Report

==== Week 3 ====
===== Tournament 3 =====
- Venue: Arena Park Sports Hall, Strumica, North Macedonia

Date	Time		Score		Set 1	Set 2	Set 3	Set 4	Set 5	Total	Report
31 May	18:00	Iceland	0–3	Israel	14–25	14–25	10–25			38–75	Report
1 Jun	18:00	Austria	3–0	Iceland	25–16	34–32	25–14			84–62	Report
2 Jun	18:00	Israel	3–2	Austria	25–23	25–17	26–28	23–25	16–14	115–107	Report

==== Week 4 ====
===== Tournament 4 =====
- Venue: Johann Pölz Halle, Amstetten, Austria

Date	Time		Score		Set 1	Set 2	Set 3	Set 4	Set 5	Total	Report
7 Jun	16:00	Faroe Islands	0–3	Austria	14–25	14–25	15–25			43–75	Report
8 Jun	16:00	Israel	3–0	Faroe Islands	25–17	25–9	25–19			75–45	Report
9 Jun	16:00	Austria	0–3	Israel	20–25	21–25	15–25			56–75	Report

=== Results by round ===
The table listed the results of teams in each round.

Win	Loss

Team ╲ Round	1	2	3	4	5	6
Austria	W	W	W	L	W	L
Israel	W	W	W	W	W	W
Iceland	W	L	L	L	L	L
Faroe Islands	L	L	W	L	L	L

Source: CEV

=== Final ===
The Final was held in Austria.

Final
13 June
Israel	3
Austria	2

Date	Time		Score		Set 1	Set 2	Set 3	Set 4	Set 5	Total	Report
13 Jun	20:30	Israel	3–2	Austria	22–25	25–27	25–19	29–27	16–14	117–112	Report

== Final standing ==
Rank	Team
1st place, gold medalist(s)	Ukraine
2nd place, silver medalist(s)	Croatia
3rd place, bronze medalist(s)	Czech Republic
4	Estonia
5	Belgium
6	Spain
7	Finland
8	Portugal
9	Romania
10	North Macedonia
11	Luxembourg
12	Azerbaijan
13	Israel
14	Austria
15	Faroe Islands
16	Iceland

Qualified for the 2024 Challenger Cup
Qualified for the 2024 Challenger Cup via FIVB World Ranking

2024 European League champions

Ukraine
2nd title

== See also ==
- 2024 Women's European Volleyball League
