= 2025 Men's European Volleyball League =

CEV Golden League

- Dates: 6 June – 6 July
- Teams: 20

The 2025 Men's European Volleyball League was the 21st edition of the annual Men's European Volleyball League, which featured men's national volleyball teams from 20 European countries.

The tournament had two divisions: the Golden League, which featured 12 teams, and the Silver League, which featured 8 teams.

== Pools composition ==
Teams were seeded according to their European Ranking for national teams as of 30 August 2024. Rankings are shown in brackets.

=== Golden League ===
The numbers in brackets indicated their CEV rankings.

League phase
Czech Republic (10)
Portugal (11)
Romania (13)
Finland (14)
Croatia (16)
Greece (17)
Spain (18)
Latvia (19)
Slovakia (21)
North Macedonia (23)
Montenegro (25)
Israel (29)

=== Silver League ===
League phase
Austria (26)
Hungary (27)
Sweden (30)
Georgia (33)
Faroe Islands (34)
Luxembourg (35)
Iceland (36)
Azerbaijan (37)

== Golden League ==
2025 Men's European Golden League
Tournament details
- Host country: Czech Republic (final four)
- Dates: 6 June – 6 July
- Teams: 12

Final positions
- Champions: Finland (1st title)
- Runners-up: Czech Republic
- Third place: Israel
- Fourth place: Greece

Tournament awards
- MVP: (Finland) Joonas Jokela

Tournament statistics
- Matches played: 40

=== Schedule ===
The schedule was as follows:

Round	Round date
Week 1	6–8 June 2025
Week 2	13–15 June 2025
Week 3	19–22 June 2025
Final four	5–6 July 2025

=== Tournament schedule ===
Week 1
Tournament 1 (North Macedonia) Strumica (Note: Due to the Gaza war, Israel's tournament will be held at a neutral venue.)	Tournament 2 (Slovakia) Bratislava	Tournament 3 (Greece) Arta	Tournament 4 (Romania) Mioveni
Israel (12) (H); Czech Republic (1); Croatia (5)	Slovakia (9) (H); Finland (4); North Macedonia (10)	Greece (6) (H); Portugal (2); Spain (7)	Romania (3) (H); Latvia (8); Montenegro (11)
Week 2
Tournament 5 (Montenegro) Podgorica	Tournament 6 (Latvia) Daugavpils	Tournament 7 (Croatia) Zadar	Tournament 8 (Portugal) Loulé
Montenegro (11) (H); Czech Republic (1); Finland (4)	Latvia (8) (H); Greece (6); North Macedonia (10)	Croatia (5) (H); Romania (3); Spain (7)	Portugal (2) (H); Slovakia (9); Israel (12)
Week 3
Tournament 9 (North Macedonia) Strumica	Tournament 10 (Spain) Lugo	Tournament 11 (Finland) Nokia	Tournament 12 (Czech Republic) Kutná Hora
North Macedonia (10) (H); Montenegro (11); Israel (12)	Spain (7) (H); Latvia (8); Slovakia (9)	Finland (4) (H); Croatia (5); Greece (6)	Czech Republic (1) (H); Portugal (2); Romania (3)

=== Tiebreaker ===
1. Total number of victories (matches won, matches lost)
2. In the event of a tie, the following first tiebreaker will apply: The teams will be ranked by the most point gained per match as follows:
  - Match won 3–0 or 3–1: 3 points for the winner, 0 points for the loser
  - Match won 3–2: 2 points for the winner, 1 point for the loser
  - Match forfeited: 3 points for the winner, 0 points (0–25, 0–25, 0–25) for the loser
3. If teams are still tied after examining the number of victories and points gained, then the FIVB will examine the results in order to break the tie in the following order:
  - Set quotient: if two or more teams are tied on the number of points gained, they will be ranked by the quotient resulting from the division of the number of all set won by the number of all sets lost.
  - Points quotient: if the tie persists based on the set quotient, the teams will be ranked by the quotient resulting from the division of all points scored by the total of points lost during all sets.
  - If the tie persists based on the point quotient, the tie will be broken based on the team that won the match of the Round Robin Phase between the tied teams. When the tie in point quotient is between three or more teams, these teams ranked taking into consideration only the matches involving the teams in question.

=== League round ===
- All times are local.

Pos	Team	Pld	W	L	Pts	SW	SL	SR	SPW	SPL	SPR	Qualification or relegation
1	Israel	6	6	0	17	18	6	3.000	582	500	1.164	Golden League Final four
2	Greece	6	5	1	16	17	7	2.429	583	536	1.088	Golden League Final four
3	Finland	6	5	1	15	16	4	4.000	482	381	1.265	Golden League Final four
4	Romania	6	5	1	15	17	6	2.833	546	493	1.108	
5	Spain	6	4	2	11	13	10	1.300	521	514	1.014	
6	Czech Republic (Note: Qualified as final four host)	6	3	3	8	12	12	1.000	556	555	1.002	Golden League Final four
7	Portugal	6	2	4	7	11	14	0.786	565	566	0.998	
8	Slovakia	6	2	4	7	10	13	0.769	478	536	0.892	
9	North Macedonia	6	2	4	5	6	14	0.429	427	469	0.910	
10	Croatia	6	1	5	3	8	17	0.471	547	601	0.910	
11	Latvia	6	1	5	3	7	17	0.412	522	551	0.947	
12	Montenegro	6	0	6	1	3	18	0.167	401	508	0.789	Relegation to Silver League

Source: CEV

==== Week 1 ====
===== Tournament 1 =====
- Venue: Park Sports Hall, Strumica, North Macedonia

Date	Time		Score		Set 1	Set 2	Set 3	Set 4	Set 5	Total	Report
6 Jun	19:00	Croatia	1–3	Israel	23–25	26–24	22–25	22–25		93–99	Report
7 Jun	19:00	Czech Republic	3–1	Croatia	25–23	23–25	25–23	25–20		98–91	Report
8 Jun	19:00	Israel	3–1	Czech Republic	25–27	25–23	25–19	25–22		100–91	Report

===== Tournament 2 =====
- Venue: Gopass Arena, Bratislava, Slovakia

Date	Time		Score		Set 1	Set 2	Set 3	Set 4	Set 5	Total	Report
6 Jun	17:00	Finland	3–0	Slovakia	25–21	25–12	25–13			75–46	Report
7 Jun	15:00	North Macedonia	0–3	Finland	20–25	15–25	19–25			54–75	Report
8 Jun	15:00	Slovakia	3–0	North Macedonia	25–21	25–22	25–23			75–66	Report

===== Tournament 3 =====
- Venue: T9 Indoor Sport Hall Kostakioi, Arta, Greece

Date	Time		Score		Set 1	Set 2	Set 3	Set 4	Set 5	Total	Report
6 Jun	19:00	Spain	1–3	Greece	20–25	30–28	18–25	22–25		90–103	Report
7 Jun	19:00	Portugal	1–3	Spain	21–25	18–25	25–19	24–26		88–95	Report
8 Jun	19:00	Greece	3–1	Portugal	16–25	25–23	25–23	25–23		91–94	Report

===== Tournament 4 =====
- Venue: Mioveni Sports Hall, Mioveni, Romania

Date	Time		Score		Set 1	Set 2	Set 3	Set 4	Set 5	Total	Report
6 Jun	19:30	Montenegro	0–3	Romania	19–25	16–25	19–25			54–75	Report
7 Jun	19:30	Latvia	3–2	Montenegro	22–25	25–21	25–19	21–25	15–10	108–100	Report
8 Jun	19:30	Romania	3–0	Latvia	25–23	25–20	25–21			75–64	Report

==== Week 2 ====
===== Tournament 5 =====
- Venue: Verde Complex, Podgorica, Montenegro

Date	Time		Score		Set 1	Set 2	Set 3	Set 4	Set 5	Total	Report
13 Jun	19:00	Czech Republic	3–0	Montenegro	25–23	25–22	25–14			75–59	Report
14 Jun	19:00	Finland	3–1	Czech Republic	20–25	25–14	25–22	25–23		95–84	Report
15 Jun	19:00	Montenegro	0–3	Finland	18–25	10–25	23–25			51–75	Report

===== Tournament 6 =====
- Venue: Daugavpils Olympic Centre, Daugavpils, Latvia

Date	Time		Score		Set 1	Set 2	Set 3	Set 4	Set 5	Total	Report
13 Jun	20:00	North Macedonia	3–2	Latvia	18–25	25–19	20–25	25–23	25–23	113–115	Report
14 Jun	18:00	Greece	3–0	North Macedonia	25–22	25–21	25–20			75–63	Report
15 Jun	16:00	Latvia	1–3	Greece	25–23	23–25	17–25	22–25		87–98	Report

===== Tournament 7 =====
- Venue: Krešimir Ćosić Hall, Zadar, Croatia

Date	Time		Score		Set 1	Set 2	Set 3	Set 4	Set 5	Total	Report
13 Jun	19:30	Spain	3–1	Croatia	25–23	23–25	25–22	25–19		98–89	Report
14 Jun	19:30	Romania	3–0	Spain	25–19	25–20	25–20			75–59	Report
15 Jun	19:30	Croatia	2–3	Romania	21–25	22–25	29–27	25–20	14–16	111–113	Report

===== Tournament 8 =====
- Venue: Pavilhão Municipal Professor Joaquim Vairinhos, Loulé, Portugal

Date	Time		Score		Set 1	Set 2	Set 3	Set 4	Set 5	Total	Report
13 Jun	21:00	Slovakia	1–3	Portugal	16–25	29–27	23–25	16–25		84–102	Report
14 Jun	17:00	Israel	3–1	Slovakia	25–23	25–18	23–25	25–15		98–81	Report
15 Jun	15:00	Portugal	2–3	Israel	13–25	18–25	25–20	26–24	14–16	96–110	Report

==== Week 3 ====
===== Tournament 9 =====
- Venue: Park Sports Hall, Strumica, North Macedonia

Date	Time		Score		Set 1	Set 2	Set 3	Set 4	Set 5	Total	Report
20 Jun	20:00	Israel	3–0	North Macedonia	25–22	25–16	25–18			75–56	Report
21 Jun	20:00	Montenegro	1–3	Israel	27–25	20–25	15–25	21–25		83–100	Report
22 Jun	20:00	North Macedonia	3–0	Montenegro	25–20	25–21	25–13			75–54	Report

===== Tournament 10 =====
- Venue: Pavillón dos Deportes de Lugo, Lugo, Spain

Date	Time		Score		Set 1	Set 2	Set 3	Set 4	Set 5	Total	Report
20 Jun	19:30	Slovakia	2–3	Spain	21–25	25–22	25–16	17–25	14–16	102–104	Report
21 Jun	17:00	Latvia	1–3	Slovakia	25–15	20–25	23–25	23–25		91–90	Report
22 Jun	19:00	Spain	3–0	Latvia	25–22	25–22	25–13			75–57	Report

===== Tournament 11 =====
- Venue: AGCO Power Arena, Nokia, Finland

Date	Time		Score		Set 1	Set 2	Set 3	Set 4	Set 5	Total	Report
19 Jun	18:30	Greece	3–1	Finland	23–25	25–18	25–23	25–21		98–87	Report
20 Jun	15:00	Croatia	3–2	Greece	25–22	22–25	18–25	30–28	20–18	115–118	Report
21 Jun	17:00	Finland	3–0	Croatia	25–16	25–12	25–20			75–48	Report

===== Tournament 12 =====
- Venue: Sportovní hala Klimeška, Kutná Hora, Czech Republic

Date	Time		Score		Set 1	Set 2	Set 3	Set 4	Set 5	Total	Report
19 Jun	19:45	Romania	2–3	Czech Republic	37–35	17–25	22–25	25–18	11–15	112–118	Report
20 Jun	17:00	Portugal	1–3	Romania	18–25	25–21	22–25	22–25		87–96	Report
21 Jun	17:00	Czech Republic	1–3	Portugal	23–25	25–23	20–25	22–25		90–98	Report

=== Results by round ===
The table listed the results of teams in each round.

Win	Loss

Team ╲ Round	1	2	3	4	5	6
Czech Republic	W	L	W	L	W	L
Portugal	L	L	W	L	L	W
Romania	W	W	W	W	L	W
Finland	W	W	W	W	L	W
Croatia	L	L	L	L	W	L
Greece	W	W	W	W	W	L
Spain	L	W	W	L	W	W
Latvia	W	L	L	L	L	L
Slovakia	L	W	L	L	L	W
North Macedonia	L	L	W	L	L	W
Montenegro	L	L	L	L	L	L
Israel	W	W	W	W	W	W

Source: CEV

=== Final four ===
The Final four was held in the Czech Republic.

Semifinals
5 July
Greece	0
Finland	3
5 July
Israel	0
Czech Republic	3

Final
6 July
Finland	3
Czech Republic	1
3rd place match
6 July
Greece	1
Israel	3

==== Semifinals ====
Date	Time		Score		Set 1	Set 2	Set 3	Set 4	Set 5	Total	Report
5 Jul	16:00	Greece	0–3	Finland	19–25	23–25	20–25			62–75	Report
5 Jul	19:00	Israel	0–3	Czech Republic	14–25	24–26	23–25			61–76	Report

==== 3rd place match ====
Date	Time		Score		Set 1	Set 2	Set 3	Set 4	Set 5	Total	Report
6 Jul	16:00	Greece	1–3	Israel	17–25	25–23	23–25	21–25		86–98	Report

==== Final ====
Date	Time		Score		Set 1	Set 2	Set 3	Set 4	Set 5	Total	Report
6 Jul	19:00	Finland	3–1	Czech Republic	24–26	26–24	25–15	25–23		100–88	Report

== Silver League ==
2025 Men's European Volleyball League
Tournament details
- Host country: Hungary / Sweden (final)
- Dates: 6 June – 6 July
- Teams: 8
- Runners-up: Hungary
- Third place: Luxembourg
- Fourth place: Austria

Tournament statistics
- Matches played: 26

=== Schedule ===
The schedule was as follows:

Round	Round date
Week 1	6–8 June 2025
Week 2	13–15 June 2025
Week 3	20–22 June 2025
Week 4	27–29 June 2025
Final	3 & 6 July 2025

=== Tournament schedule ===
Week 1
Tournament 1 (Luxembourg) Bertrange	Tournament 2 (Sweden) Umeå
Luxembourg (6) (H); Austria (1); Iceland (7)	Sweden (3) (H); Georgia (4); Azerbaijan (8)
Week 2
Tournament 3 (Iceland) Kópavogur	Tournament 4 (Azerbaijan) Baku
Iceland (7) (H); Sweden (3); Faroe Islands (5)	Azerbaijan (8) (H); Hungary (2); Luxembourg (6)
Week 3
Tournament 5 (Faroe Islands) Sandur	Tournament 6 (Hungary) Kecskemét
Faroe Islands (5) (H); Austria (1); Azerbaijan (8)	Hungary (2) (H); Georgia (4); Iceland (7)
Week 4
Tournament 7 (Georgia (country)) Tbilisi	Tournament 8 (Austria) Amstetten
Georgia (4) (H); Faroe Islands (5); Luxembourg (6)	Austria (1) (H); Hungary (2); Sweden (3)

=== Tiebreaker ===
1. Total number of victories (matches won, matches lost)
2. In the event of a tie, the following first tiebreaker will apply: The teams will be ranked by the most point gained per match as follows:
  - Match won 3–0 or 3–1: 3 points for the winner, 0 points for the loser
  - Match won 3–2: 2 points for the winner, 1 point for the loser
  - Match forfeited: 3 points for the winner, 0 points (0–25, 0–25, 0–25) for the loser
3. If teams are still tied after examining the number of victories and points gained, then the FIVB will examine the results in order to break the tie in the following order:
  - Set quotient: if two or more teams are tied on the number of points gained, they will be ranked by the quotient resulting from the division of the number of all set won by the number of all sets lost.
  - Points quotient: if the tie persists based on the set quotient, the teams will be ranked by the quotient resulting from the division of all points scored by the total of points lost during all sets.
  - If the tie persists based on the point quotient, the tie will be broken based on the team that won the match of the Round Robin Phase between the tied teams. When the tie in point quotient is between three or more teams, these teams ranked taking into consideration only the matches involving the teams in question.

=== League round ===
- All times are local.

Pos	Team	Pld	W	L	Pts	SW	SL	SR	SPW	SPL	SPR	Qualification
1	Sweden	6	6	0	18	18	1	18.000	470	305	1.541	Silver League Final
2	Hungary	6	5	1	15	15	4	3.750	450	346	1.301	Silver League Final
3	Luxembourg	6	5	1	15	15	4	3.750	451	369	1.222	
4	Austria	6	3	3	9	11	10	1.100	486	448	1.085	
5	Azerbaijan	6	2	4	6	7	13	0.538	398	463	0.860	
6	Faroe Islands	6	2	4	5	8	15	0.533	476	530	0.898	
7	Iceland	6	1	5	3	5	17	0.294	379	498	0.761	
8	Georgia	6	0	6	1	3	18	0.167	348	499	0.697	

Source: CEV

==== Week 1 ====
===== Tournament 1 =====
- Venue: Centre Atert, Bertrange, Luxembourg

Date	Time		Score		Set 1	Set 2	Set 3	Set 4	Set 5	Total	Report
6 Jun	20:00	Iceland	0–3	Luxembourg	18–25	15–25	20–25			53–75	Report
7 Jun	20:00	Austria	3–0	Iceland	25–13	25–15	25–13			75–41	Report
8 Jun	18:00	Luxembourg	3–1	Austria	22–25	25–23	25–20	25–21		97–89	Report

===== Tournament 2 =====
- Venue: Energi Arena Vatten, Umeå, Sweden

Date	Time		Score		Set 1	Set 2	Set 3	Set 4	Set 5	Total	Report
6 Jun	17:00	Azerbaijan	0–3	Sweden	13–25	20–25	14–25			47–75	Report
7 Jun	17:00	Georgia	0–3	Azerbaijan	20–25	18–25	18–25			56–75	Report
8 Jun	17:00	Sweden	3–0	Georgia	25–12	25–13	25–12			75–37	Report

==== Week 2 ====
===== Tournament 3 =====
- Venue: Digranes Sports Hall, Kópavogur, Iceland

Date	Time		Score		Set 1	Set 2	Set 3	Set 4	Set 5	Total	Report
13 Jun	17:00	Faroe Islands	3–2	Iceland	25–21	25–18	23–25	20–25	15–13	108–102	Report
14 Jun	15:00	Sweden	3–0	Faroe Islands	25–17	25–15	25–13			75–45	Report
15 Jun	15:00	Iceland	0–3	Sweden	7–25	11–25	17–25			35–75	Report

===== Tournament 4 =====
- Venue: A.Y.S. Sport Hall, Baku, Azerbaijan

Date	Time		Score		Set 1	Set 2	Set 3	Set 4	Set 5	Total	Report
13 Jun	18:00	Luxembourg	3–0	Azerbaijan	25–20	25–19	25–21			75–60	Report
14 Jun	18:00	Hungary	3–0	Luxembourg	25–17	25–21	25–16			75–54	Report
15 Jun	18:00	Azerbaijan	1–3	Hungary	15–25	25–22	18–25	16–25		74–97	Report

==== Week 3 ====
===== Tournament 5 =====
- Venue: Høllin inni í Dal, Sandur, Faroe Islands

Date	Time		Score		Set 1	Set 2	Set 3	Set 4	Set 5	Total	Report
20 Jun	19:00	Azerbaijan	3–1	Faroe Islands	17–25	25–15	25–22	25–23		92–85	Report
21 Jun	17:00	Austria	3–0	Azerbaijan	25–18	25–18	25–14			75–50	Report
22 Jun	17:00	Faroe Islands	1–3	Austria	29–27	17–25	24–26	20–25		90–103	Report

===== Tournament 6 =====
- Venue: Messzi István Sportcsarnok, Kecskemét, Hungary

Date	Time		Score		Set 1	Set 2	Set 3	Set 4	Set 5	Total	Report
20 Jun	17:00	Iceland	0–3	Hungary	11–25	14–25	20–25			45–75	Report
21 Jun	17:00	Georgia	2–3	Iceland	14–25	26–24	25–14	19–25	6–15	90–103	Report
22 Jun	17:00	Hungary	3–0	Georgia	25–9	25–17	25–16			75–42	Report

==== Week 4 ====
===== Tournament 7 =====
- Venue: (Georgia (country)) Tbilisi Sports Palace Small Hall, Tbilisi, Georgia

Date	Time		Score		Set 1	Set 2	Set 3	Set 4	Set 5	Total	Report
27 Jun	19:00	Luxembourg	3–0	Georgia	25–17	25–14	25–9			75–40	Report
28 Jun	19:00	Faroe Islands	0–3	Luxembourg	16–25	14–25	22–25			52–75	Report
29 Jun	19:00	Georgia	1–3	Faroe Islands	18–25	25–21	22–25	18–25		83–96	Report

===== Tournament 8 =====
- Venue: Johann Pölz Halle, Amstetten, Austria

Date	Time		Score		Set 1	Set 2	Set 3	Set 4	Set 5	Total	Report
27 Jun	17:35	Sweden	3–1	Austria	25–22	25–18	20–25	25–23		95–88	Report
28 Jun	17:35	Hungary	0–3	Sweden	15–25	21–25	17–25			53–75	Report
29 Jun	17:35	Austria	0–3	Hungary	18–25	20–25	18–25			56–75	Report

=== Results by round ===
The table listed the results of teams in each round.

Win	Loss

Team ╲ Round	1	2	3	4	5	6
Austria	W	L	W	W	L	L
Hungary	W	W	W	W	L	W
Sweden	W	W	W	W	W	W
Georgia	L	L	L	L	L	L
Faroe Islands	W	L	L	L	L	W
Luxembourg	W	W	W	L	W	W
Iceland	L	L	L	L	L	W
Azerbaijan	L	W	L	L	W	L

Source: CEV

=== Final ===
Team 1	Agg.	Team 2	1st leg	2nd leg
Sweden	4–2	Hungary	3–1	2–3

Date	Time		Score		Set 1	Set 2	Set 3	Set 4	Set 5	Total	Report
3 Jul	18:30	Hungary	1–3	Sweden	25–21	20–25	16–25	15–25		76–96	Report
6 Jul	17:00	Sweden	2–3	Hungary	25–17	20–25	27–29	25–16	15–17	112–104	Report

== Final standing ==
Rank	Team
1st place, gold medalist(s)	Finland
2nd place, silver medalist(s)	Czech Republic
3rd place, bronze medalist(s)	Israel
4	Greece
5	Romania
6	Spain
7	Portugal
8	Slovakia
9	North Macedonia
10	Croatia
11	Latvia
12	Montenegro
13	Sweden
14	Hungary
15	Luxembourg
16	Austria
17	Azerbaijan
18	Faroe Islands
19	Iceland
20	Georgia

2025 European League champions

Finland
1st title

== See also ==
- 2025 Women's European Volleyball League
