= Latvia men's national volleyball team =

Men's national volleyball team representing Latvia

Latvia
- Association: Latvian Volleyball Federation (Latvijas volejbola federācija)
- Confederation: CEV
- Head coach: Uģis Krastiņš
- FIVB ranking: 44 ▲6 (1 October 2026)

Uniforms
| Home | Away |

Summer Olympics
- Appearances: 0

World Championship
- Appearances: 0

European Championship
- Appearances: 2 (First in 1995)
- Best result: 11th (1995)
- volejbols.lv

The Latvia men's national volleyball team (Latvian: Latvijas vīriešu volejbola izlase) represents Latvia in international men's volleyball competitions and friendly matches. It is governed by the Latvian Volleyball Federation and takes part in international volleyball competitions.

The team was formed shortly after regaining full independence in 1991. The biggest achievement of the national team until 2020 was the qualification for the group stage of the 1995 Men's European Volleyball Championship in Greece.

In September 2020, the team qualified for the 2021 Men's European Volleyball Championship after beating Cyprus 3-0 and claiming the top spot in Qualifying Pool D, which came after a 26-year-long absence from the European championships.

Afterwards, the team also qualified for the 2026 Men's European Volleyball Championship.

== Results ==
=== European Championship ===
Champions Runners up Third place Fourth place

European Championship record
| Year | Round | Position | Pld | W | L | SW | SL | Squad |
|---|---|---|---|---|---|---|---|---|
| 1948–1991 | Did not enter due to Soviet occupation | | | | | | | |
| (Finland) 1993 | Did not qualify | | | | | | | |
| (Greece) 1995 | Group stage | 11th place | 5 | 0 | 5 | 1 | 15 | |
| 1997–2019 | Did not qualify | | | | | | | |
| (Poland) (Czech Republic) (Estonia) (Finland) 2021 | Round of 16 | 16th place | 6 | 1 | 5 | 8 | 16 | Squad |
| (Italy) (North Macedonia) (Bulgaria) (Israel) 2023 | Did not qualify | | | | | | | |
| (Italy) (Bulgaria) (Finland) (Romania) 2026 | Round of 16 | 15th place | 6 | 2 | 4 | 8 | 14 | Squad |
| (Montenegro) 2028 | To be determined | | | | | | | |
| Total | 3/34 | 0 Titles | 17 | 3 | 14 | 17 | 45 | |

=== World League / Nations League ===
Champions Runners up Third place Fourth place

World League record
| Year | Round (Group) | Position (Overall) | Pld | W | L | SW | SL | Squad |
|---|---|---|---|---|---|---|---|---|
| 1990–2015 | Did not enter | | | | | | | |
| 2016-2017 | Did not qualify | | | | | | | |
Nations League record
| (France) 2018 | Did not qualify | | | | | | | |
| (United States) 2019 | Did not qualify | | | | | | | |
| (Italy) 2020 | Originally to be hosted by Italy, Cancelled due to COVID-19 pandemic. | | | | | | | |
| (Italy) 2021 | Did not qualify | | | | | | | |
| Total | 0/3 | 0 Titles | 0 | 0 | 0 | 0 | 0 | |

- From 2018, the World League was replaced by the Nations League.

=== European League ===
Champions Runners up Third place Fourth place

European League record
| Year | Round | Position | Pld | W | L | SW | SL |
|---|---|---|---|---|---|---|---|
| 2004-2006 | Did not enter | | | | | | |
| (Portugal) 2007 | League round | 11th place | 12 | 2 | 10 | 19 | 32 |
| 2008-2017 | Did not enter | | | | | | |
| (Czech Republic) 2018 | Silver League, Final four | 15th place (Bronze) | 8 | 7 | 1 | 21 | 7 |
| (Estonia) 2019 | Golden League, League round | 5th place | 6 | 3 | 3 | 11 | 12 |
| (Belgium) 2021 | Golden League, League round | 10th place | 6 | 0 | 6 | 3 | 18 |
| (Croatia) 2022 | Golden League, League round | 10th place | 6 | 0 | 6 | 3 | 18 |
| (Croatia) 2023 | Silver League, Final four | 13th place (Gold) | 8 | 8 | 0 | 24 | 1 |
| (Croatia) 2024 | Did not enter | | | | | | |
| (Czech Republic) 2025 | Golden League, League round | 11th place | 6 | 1 | 5 | 7 | 17 |
| (Finland) (Netherlands) 2026 | League round | 13th place | 6 | 3 | 3 | 13 | 10 |
| Total | 8/22 | 0 Titles | 58 | 24 | 34 | 101 | 115 |

== Kit suppliers ==
| Years | Brand |
|---|---|
| before 2018 | (Italy) Errea |
| 2018–present | (Japan) Mizuno |

== Current squad ==
This is the roster of the Latvian team for the 2019 CEV Volleyball European Golden League.

Head Coach: (Estonia) Avo Keel

| No. | Name | Date of birth | Height | Weight | Spike | Block | Current club |
|---|---|---|---|---|---|---|---|
| 1 | Ingars Ivanovs (C) | 2 April 1987 | 1.83 m (6 ft 0 in) | 78 kg (172 lb) | 315 cm (124 in) | 305 cm (120 in) | (Finland) Karelian Hurmos |
| 2 | Jānis Jansons | 31 August 2000 | 1.94 m (6 ft 4 in) | 85 kg (187 lb) | 325 cm (128 in) | 315 cm (124 in) | (Latvia) OC Limbaži/MSĢ |
| 3 | Toms Vanags | 11 February 1988 | 1.90 m (6 ft 3 in) | 85 kg (187 lb) | 344 cm (135 in) | 330 cm (130 in) | (Czech Republic) Aero Odolena Voda |
| 4 | Toms Švāns | 2 August 1993 | 1.98 m (6 ft 6 in) | 90 kg (200 lb) | 345 cm (136 in) | 330 cm (130 in) | (Estonia) Pärnu VK |
| 5 | Reinis Pekmans | 2 April 1987 | 2.02 m (6 ft 8 in) | 97 kg (214 lb) | 341 cm (134 in) | 326 cm (128 in) | (France) Martigues Volley-Ball |
| 7 | Romāns Saušs | 6 June 1993 | 1.92 m (6 ft 4 in) | 88 kg (194 lb) | 340 cm (130 in) | 325 cm (128 in) | (Germany) Powervolleys Düren |
| 8 | Aleksandrs Kudrjašovs | 20 September 1988 | 1.95 m (6 ft 5 in) | 88 kg (194 lb) | 338 cm (133 in) | 325 cm (128 in) | (Finland) Kokkolan Tiikerit |
| 9 | Hermans Egleskalns | 8 December 1990 | 2.04 m (6 ft 8 in) | 100 kg (220 lb) | 357 cm (141 in) | 340 cm (130 in) | (France) Tours VB |
| 10 | Armands Āboliņš | 4 April 1992 | 1.88 m (6 ft 2 in) | 82 kg (181 lb) | 335 cm (132 in) | 320 cm (130 in) | (Latvia) RTU/Robežsardze |
| 11 | Deniss Petrovs | 31 August 1986 | 1.88 m (6 ft 2 in) | 85 kg (187 lb) | 344 cm (135 in) | 330 cm (130 in) | (Russia) Dynamo LO |
| 13 | Edvīns Skruders | 13 November 1997 | 1.88 m (6 ft 2 in) | 83 kg (183 lb) | 335 cm (132 in) | 320 cm (130 in) | (Latvia) Jēkabpils Lūši |
| 14 | Andrejs Zavorotnijs | 23 July 1985 | 1.94 m (6 ft 4 in) | 90 kg (200 lb) | 339 cm (133 in) | 221 cm (87 in) | (Latvia) RTU/Robežsardze |
| 15 | Edgars Šimanskis | 1 September 1997 | 2.08 m (6 ft 10 in) | 90 kg (200 lb) | 340 cm (130 in) | 325 cm (128 in) | (Latvia) OC Limbaži/MSĢ |
| 17 | Atvars Ozoliņš | 17 December 1998 | 1.91 m (6 ft 3 in) | 85 kg (187 lb) | 335 cm (132 in) | 320 cm (130 in) | (Estonia) Pärnu VK |
| 18 | Aleksandrs Avdejevs | 28 April 1995 | 2.00 m (6 ft 7 in) | 90 kg (200 lb) | 340 cm (130 in) | 330 cm (130 in) | (Latvia) RTU/Robežsardze |
| 19 | Kristaps Platačs | 28 September 1999 | 2.00 m (6 ft 7 in) | 89 kg (196 lb) | 344 cm (135 in) | 325 cm (128 in) | (Latvia) OC Limbaži/MSĢ |
| | Zigurds Adamovičs | 7 May 1998 | 1.92 m (6 ft 4 in) | 77 kg (170 lb) | 315 cm (124 in) | 298 cm (117 in) | (Latvia) Jēkabpils Lūši |
| | Vladislavs Blumbergs | 27 December 1999 | 1.96 m (6 ft 5 in) | 84 kg (185 lb) | 320 cm (130 in) | 315 cm (124 in) | (Latvia) Jēkabpils Lūši |
| | Markuss Cielavs | 18 October 1999 | 2.00 m (6 ft 7 in) | 84 kg (185 lb) | 340 cm (130 in) | 330 cm (130 in) | (Finland) Etta |
| | Renārs Pauls Jansons | 17 May 2002 | 1.97 m (6 ft 6 in) | 86 kg (190 lb) | 340 cm (130 in) | 330 cm (130 in) | (Latvia) RTU/Robežsardze |
| | Jānis Eduards Medenis | 26 October 2000 | 2.00 m (6 ft 7 in) | 90 kg (200 lb) | 330 cm (130 in) | 320 cm (130 in) | (Latvia) Jēkabpils Lūši |
| | Dāvis Emīls Melnis | 27 May 1997 | 1.75 m (5 ft 9 in) | 79 kg (174 lb) | 315 cm (124 in) | 305 cm (120 in) | (Latvia) Jēkabpils Lūši |
| | Aleksandrs Nasonovs | 31 March 1998 | 2.00 m (6 ft 7 in) | 77 kg (170 lb) | 325 cm (128 in) | 305 cm (120 in) | (Latvia) OC Limbaži/MSĢ |

== Other squads ==
- Men's
- Men's Junior U-20

The men's junior team participated in the 2012 CEV Junior Volleyball European Championship.

- Men's U-18
