= Jakub Janouch =

Czech volleyball player (born 1990)

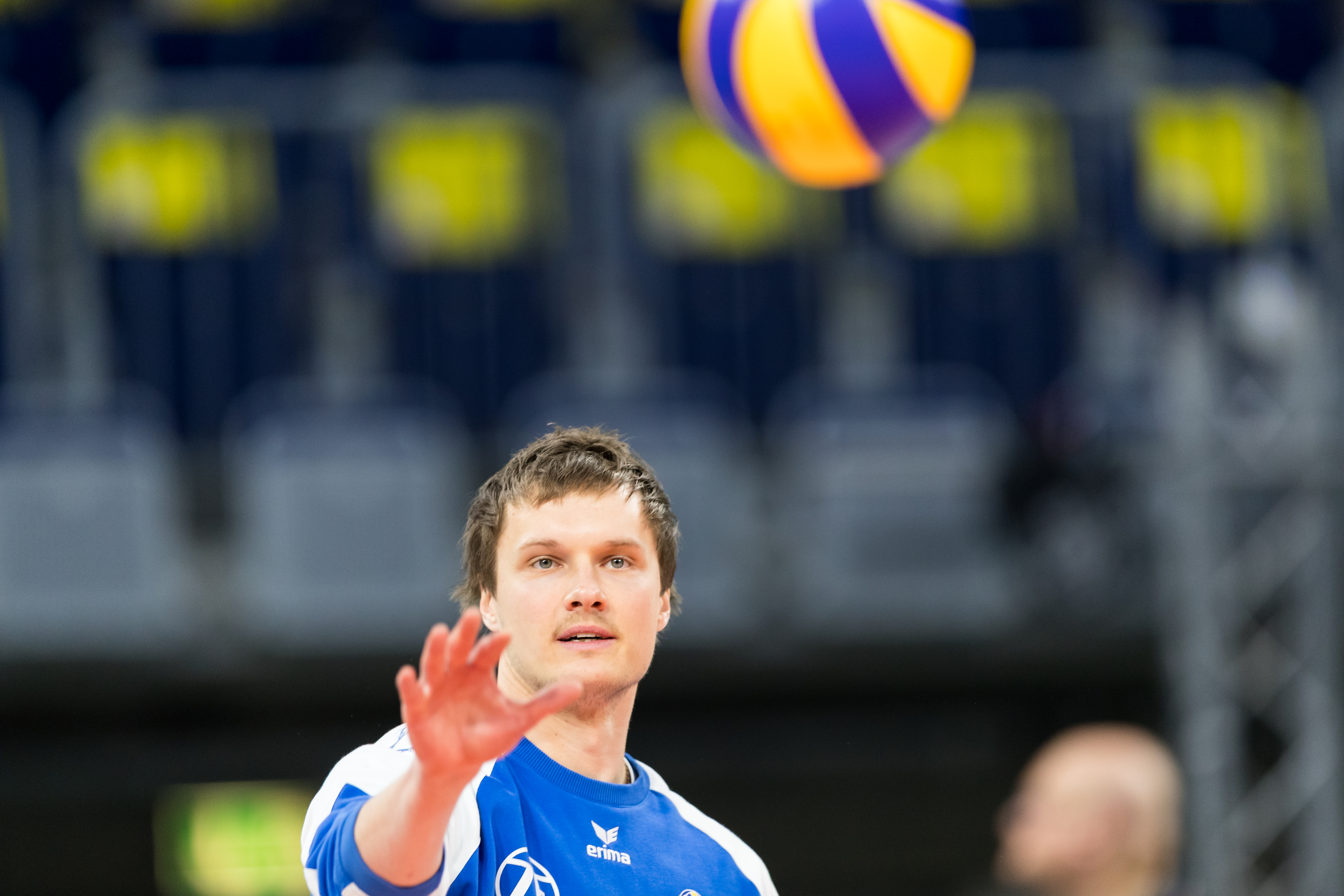
- Jakub Janouch at Pokalfinale 2019

Personal information
- Nationality: Czech
- Born: 13 June 1990 (age 36)
- Height: 1.94 m (6 ft 4 in)
- Weight: 88 kg (194 lb)
- Spike: 335 cm (132 in)
- Block: 325 cm (128 in)

Volleyball information
- Position: Setter
- Current club: Lvi Praha
- Number: 8

Career
Years	Teams
2015–	VK Dukla Liberec

National team
2015–	Czech Republic

Jakub Janouch (born 13 June 1990) is a Czech male volleyball player. He is part of the Czech Republic men's national volleyball team. On club level he played for VK Dukla Liberec.
