= 2026 Men's European Volleyball League =

European men's volleyball tournament

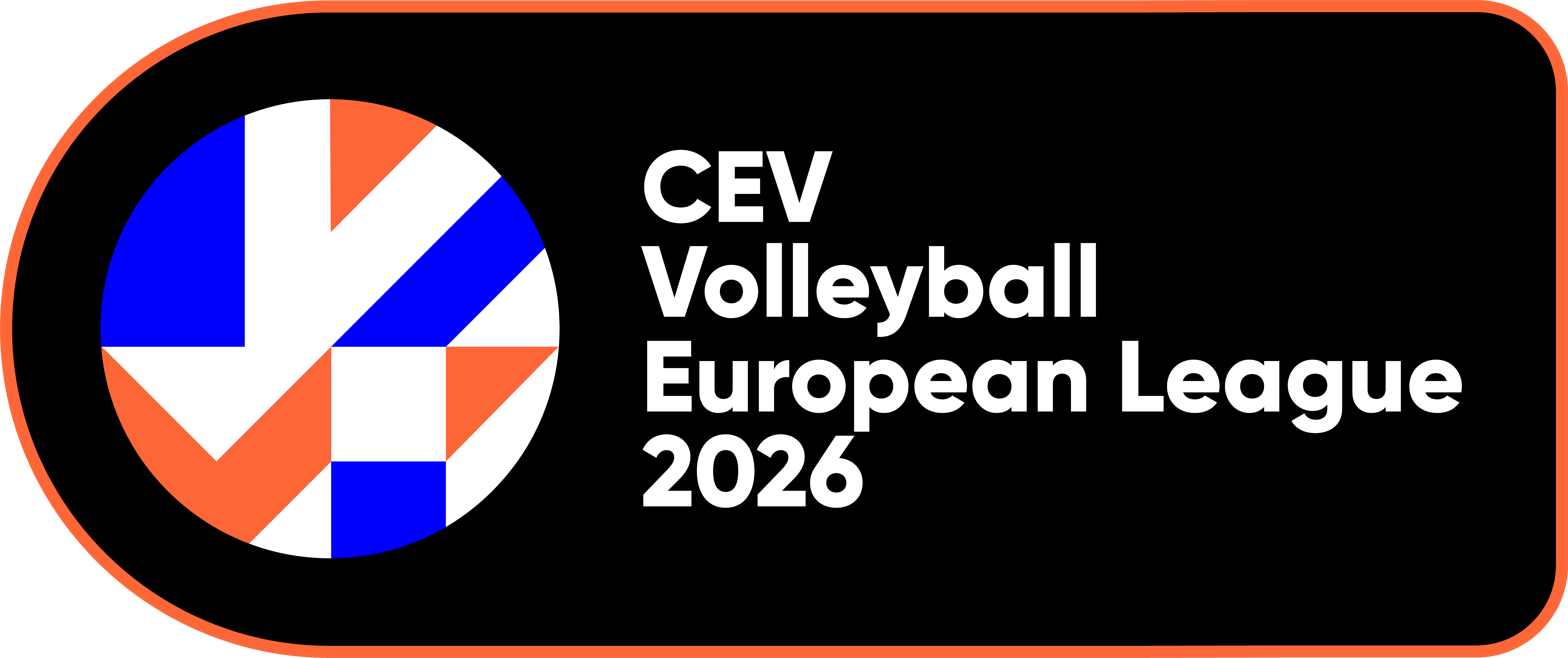
- Dates: 5 June – 11 July
- Teams: 27

Final positions
- Champions: Finland (2nd title)
- Runners-up: Netherlands
- Third place: Denmark

Tournament awards
- MVP: (Finland) Luka Marttila

Tournament statistics
- Matches played: 87

The 2026 Men's European Volleyball League was the 22nd edition of the annual Men's European Volleyball League, which featured men's national volleyball teams from European countries that didn't take part in the FIVB Men's Volleyball Nations League. The tournament took place from 5 June to 11 July 2026.

This was the first edition to be used as 2028 Men's European Volleyball Championship qualification after CEV announced the change on 8 November 2025. The top four teams qualified for the 2028 European Championship joining co-host Montenegro and three yet to be determined hosts.

As the competition was changed to act as European Championship qualification, the golden and silver leagues were merged into one big league. As well as those changes, a final six was introduced to decide the champions. However, since no hosts were found, it was reverted to a home and away final four.

== Pools composition ==
Teams were seeded according to their European Ranking for national teams as of 12 November 2025. Rankings are shown in brackets.

League phase
Finland (9)
Czech Republic (10)
Netherlands (11)
Romania (12)
Greece (15)
Portugal (16)
Israel (17)
Switzerland (18)
Estonia (19)
Slovakia (20)
Spain (21)
Croatia (22)
Denmark (23)
Sweden (24)
Latvia (25)
North Macedonia (26)
Hungary (27)
Austria (28)
Montenegro (30)
Norway (32)
Luxembourg (33)
Kosovo (35)
Azerbaijan (38)
Iceland (39)
Georgia (40)
Bosnia and Herzegovina (–)
Albania (–)

== Schedule ==
The schedule was as follows:

Round	Round date
Week 1	5–7 June 2026
Week 2	12–14 June 2026
Week 3	19–21 June 2026
Final round	27 June – 11 July 2026

=== Tournament schedule ===
Week 1
Tournament 1 (Austria) Schwechat	Tournament 2 (Hungary) Kecskemét	Tournament 3 (North Macedonia) Strumica
Austria (18) (H); Finland (1); Montenegro (19)	Hungary (17) (H); Czech Republic (2); Norway (20)	North Macedonia (16) (H); Netherlands (3); Luxembourg (21)
Tournament 4 (Latvia) Riga	Tournament 5 (Sweden) Lund	Tournament 6 (Denmark) Odense
Latvia (15) (H); Romania (4); Kosovo (22)	Sweden (14) (H); Greece (5); Azerbaijan (23)	Denmark (13) (H); Portugal (6); Iceland (24)
Tournament 7 (Croatia) Osijek	Tournament 8 (Spain) Torrejón de Ardoz	Tournament 9 (Slovakia) Poprad
Croatia (12) (H); Israel (7); Georgia (25)	Spain (11) (H); Switzerland (8); Bosnia and Herzegovina (26)	Slovakia (10) (H); Estonia (9); Albania (27)
Week 2
Tournament 10 (Finland) Helsinki	Tournament 11 (Czech Republic) Jihlava	Tournament 12 (Netherlands) Doetinchem
Finland (1) (H); Croatia (12); Albania (27)	Czech Republic (2) (H); Denmark (13); Bosnia and Herzegovina (26)	Netherlands (3) (H); Slovakia (10); Georgia (25)
Tournament 13 (Romania) Mioveni	Tournament 14 (Greece) Agios Ioannis Renti	Tournament 15 (Portugal) Matosinhos
Romania (4) (H); Spain (11); Azerbaijan (23)	Greece (5) (H); North Macedonia (16); Iceland (24)	Portugal (6) (H); Latvia (15); Montenegro (19)
Tournament 16 (North Macedonia) Strumica (Note: Due to the Gaza war, Israel's tournament will be held at a neutral venue.)	Tournament 17 (Switzerland) Kriens	Tournament 18 (Estonia) Tallinn
Israel (7) (H); Sweden (14); Norway (20)	Switzerland (8) (H); Hungary (17); Luxembourg (21)	Estonia (9) (H); Austria (18); Kosovo (22)
Week 3
Tournament 19 (Iceland) Kópavogur	Tournament 20 (Georgia (country)) Tbilisi	Tournament 21 (Bosnia and Herzegovina) Goražde
Iceland (24) (H); Finland (1); Slovakia (10)	Georgia (25) (H); Czech Republic (2); Spain (11)	Bosnia and Herzegovina (26) (H); Netherlands (3); Croatia (12)
Tournament 22 (Albania) Tirana	Tournament 23 Luxembourg City	Tournament 24 (Azerbaijan) Baku
Albania (27) (H); Romania (4); Denmark (13)	Luxembourg (21) (H); Greece (5); Austria (18)	Azerbaijan (23) (H); Portugal (6); Hungary (17)
Tournament 25 (Kosovo) Pristina	Tournament 26 (Norway) Volda	Tournament 27 (Montenegro) Bijelo Polje
Kosovo (22) (H); Israel (7); North Macedonia (16)	Norway (20) (H); Switzerland (8); Latvia (15)	Montenegro (19) (H); Estonia (9); Sweden (14)

== Pool standing procedure ==
1. Total number of victories (matches won, matches lost)
2. In the event of a tie, the following first tiebreaker will apply: The teams will be ranked by the most point gained per match as follows:
  - Match won 3–0 or 3–1: 3 points for the winner, 0 points for the loser
  - Match won 3–2: 2 points for the winner, 1 point for the loser
  - Match forfeited: 3 points for the winner, 0 points (0–25, 0–25, 0–25) for the loser
3. If teams are still tied after examining the number of victories and points gained, then the FIVB will examine the results in order to break the tie in the following order:
  - Set quotient: if two or more teams are tied on the number of points gained, they will be ranked by the quotient resulting from the division of the number of all set won by the number of all sets lost.
  - Points quotient: if the tie persists based on the set quotient, the teams will be ranked by the quotient resulting from the division of all points scored by the total of points lost during all sets.
  - If the tie persists based on the point quotient, the tie will be broken based on the team that won the match of the Round Robin Phase between the tied teams. When the tie in point quotient is between three or more teams, these teams ranked taking into consideration only the matches involving the teams in question.

== League round ==
- All times are local.

Pos	Team	Pld	W	L	Pts	SW	SL	SR	SPW	SPL	SPR	Qualification
1	Netherlands	6	6	0	18	18	0	MAX	451	330	1.367	Final round
2	Finland	6	6	0	18	18	3	6.000	530	395	1.342	Final round
3	Denmark	6	6	0	17	18	3	6.000	501	401	1.249	Final round
4	Israel	6	6	0	17	18	5	3.600	545	427	1.276	Final round
5	Greece	6	5	1	16	17	4	4.250	512	415	1.234	
6	Estonia	6	5	1	16	17	4	4.250	501	429	1.168	
7	Czech Republic	6	5	1	16	17	5	3.400	529	409	1.293	
8	Switzerland	6	5	1	14	16	5	3.200	499	443	1.126	
9	Sweden	6	5	1	13	16	9	1.778	554	515	1.076	
10	Spain	6	4	2	13	15	7	2.143	505	452	1.117	
11	Hungary	6	4	2	12	12	7	1.714	434	418	1.038	
12	Portugal	6	4	2	12	13	8	1.625	487	426	1.143	
13	Latvia	6	3	3	10	13	10	1.300	523	496	1.054	
14	Slovakia	6	3	3	9	10	9	1.111	443	395	1.122	
15	Croatia	6	3	3	9	10	9	1.111	434	406	1.069	
16	North Macedonia	6	3	3	9	9	10	0.900	425	423	1.005	
17	Romania	6	3	3	8	10	11	0.909	458	430	1.065	
18	Austria	6	2	4	6	10	12	0.833	476	478	0.996	
19	Montenegro	6	2	4	6	8	14	0.571	452	512	0.883	
20	Albania	6	1	5	3	3	16	0.188	392	474	0.827	
21	Norway	6	0	6	1	5	18	0.278	471	551	0.855	
22	Azerbaijan	6	0	6	0	2	18	0.111	354	497	0.712	
23	Luxembourg	6	0	6	0	1	18	0.056	372	481	0.773	
24	Kosovo	6	0	6	0	1	18	0.056	318	476	0.668	
25	Bosnia and Herzegovina	6	0	6	0	0	18	0.000	345	452	0.763	
26	Iceland	6	0	6	0	0	18	0.000	273	450	0.607	
27	Georgia	6	0	6	0	0	18	0.000	247	450	0.549	

Source: CEV

=== Week 1 ===
==== Tournament 1 ====
- Venue: Multiversum Schwechat, Schwechat, Austria

Date	Time		Score		Set 1	Set 2	Set 3	Set 4	Set 5	Total	Attd	Report
5 Jun	20:20	Finland	3–1	Austria	21–25	25–12	25–17	25–16		96–70	907	Report
6 Jun	20:20	Montenegro	1–3	Finland	15–25	25–20	18–25	16–25		74–95	113	Report
7 Jun	17:50	Austria	1–3	Montenegro	19–25	25–20	18–25	20–25		82–95	561	Report

==== Tournament 2 ====
- Venue: Messzi István Sportcsarnok, Kecskemét, Hungary

Date	Time		Score		Set 1	Set 2	Set 3	Set 4	Set 5	Total	Attd	Report
5 Jun	17:30	Czech Republic	3–0	Hungary	25–12	25–21	25–17			75–50	300	Report
6 Jun	17:00	Norway	1–3	Czech Republic	25–23	19–25	14–25	18–25		76–98	100	Report
7 Jun	17:00	Hungary	3–0	Norway	25–18	25–22	25–18			75–58	500	Report

==== Tournament 3 ====
- Venue: Park Sports Hall, Strumica, North Macedonia

Date	Time		Score		Set 1	Set 2	Set 3	Set 4	Set 5	Total	Attd	Report
5 Jun	19:00	Netherlands	3–0	North Macedonia	25–19	25–21	25–21			75–61	600	Report
6 Jun	19:00	Luxembourg	0–3	Netherlands	17–25	22–25	16–25			55–75	120	Report
7 Jun	19:00	North Macedonia	3–1	Luxembourg	23–25	25–21	25–20	25–13		98–79	800	Report

==== Tournament 4 ====
- Venue: Komandu sporta spēļu halle, Riga, Latvia

Date	Time		Score		Set 1	Set 2	Set 3	Set 4	Set 5	Total	Attd	Report
5 Jun	19:30	Romania	0–3	Latvia	22–25	21–25	22–25			65–75	1,275	Report
6 Jun	18:00	Kosovo	0–3	Romania	19–25	18–25	14–25			51–75	20	Report
7 Jun	16:30	Latvia	3–0	Kosovo	25–12	25–21	25–13			75–46	1,535	Report

==== Tournament 5 ====
- Venue: Idrottshallen, Lund, Sweden

Date	Time		Score		Set 1	Set 2	Set 3	Set 4	Set 5	Total	Attd	Report
5 Jun	18:00	Greece	2–3	Sweden	25–19	25–23	25–27	18–25	13–15	106–109	631	Report
6 Jun	16:00	Azerbaijan	0–3	Greece	20–25	22–25	7–25			49–75	87	Report
7 Jun	16:00	Sweden	3–0	Azerbaijan	25–14	25–17	25–20			75–51	568	Report

==== Tournament 6 ====
- Venue: Arena Fyn, Odense, Denmark

Date	Time		Score		Set 1	Set 2	Set 3	Set 4	Set 5	Total	Attd	Report
5 Jun	19:00	Portugal	1–3	Denmark	17–25	25–20	22–25	19–25		83–95	512	Report
6 Jun	16:00	Iceland	0–3	Portugal	19–25	18–25	13–25			50–75	46	Report
7 Jun	16:00	Denmark	3–0	Iceland	25–16	25–12	25–14			75–42	317	Report

==== Tournament 7 ====
- Venue: Gradski vrt Hall, Osijek, Croatia

Date	Time		Score		Set 1	Set 2	Set 3	Set 4	Set 5	Total	Attd	Report
5 Jun	20:00	Israel	3–1	Croatia	19–25	25–20	25–17	25–19		94–81	500	Report
6 Jun	20:00	Georgia	0–3	Israel	14–25	17–25	15–25			46–75	35	Report
7 Jun	20:00	Croatia	3–0	Georgia	25–14	25–10	25–20			75–44	500	Report

==== Tournament 8 ====
- Venue: Pabellón Jorge Garbajosa, Torrejón de Ardoz, Spain

Date	Time		Score		Set 1	Set 2	Set 3	Set 4	Set 5	Total	Attd	Report
5 Jun	19:30	Switzerland	1–3	Spain	25–19	25–27	24–26	22–25		96–97	2,100	Report
6 Jun	18:00	Bosnia and Herzegovina	0–3	Switzerland	21–25	23–25	19–25			63–75	350	Report
7 Jun	18:00	Spain	3–0	Bosnia and Herzegovina	27–25	25–19	25–13			77–57	3,123	Report

==== Tournament 9 ====
- Venue: Aréna Poprad, Poprad, Slovakia

Date	Time		Score		Set 1	Set 2	Set 3	Set 4	Set 5	Total	Attd	Report
5 Jun	19:00	Estonia	3–0	Slovakia	26–24	28–26	25–22			79–72	1,070	Report
6 Jun	15:00	Albania	0–3	Estonia	17–25	23–25	26–28			66–78	250	Report
7 Jun	16:00	Slovakia	3–0	Albania	25–23	29–27	25–15			79–65	1,250	Report

=== Week 2 ===
==== Tournament 10 ====
- Venue: Veikkaus Arena, Helsinki, Finland

Date	Time		Score		Set 1	Set 2	Set 3	Set 4	Set 5	Total	Attd	Report
12 Jun	18:00	Albania	0–3	Finland	32–34	18–25	11–25			61–84	6,113	Report
13 Jun	16:00	Croatia	3–0	Albania	25–17	25–16	25–19			75–52	64	Report
14 Jun	15:30	Finland	3–0	Croatia	25–20	32–30	25–19			82–69	1,231	Report

==== Tournament 11 ====
- Venue: Horácká Multifunctional Arena, Jihlava, Czech Republic

Date	Time		Score		Set 1	Set 2	Set 3	Set 4	Set 5	Total	Attd	Report
12 Jun	18:00	Bosnia and Herzegovina	0–3	Czech Republic	16–25	22–25	15–25			53–75	3,253	Report
13 Jun	17:00	Denmark	3–0	Bosnia and Herzegovina	25–20	25–21	25–19			75–60	1,251	Report
14 Jun	16:00	Czech Republic	2–3	Denmark	25–15	20–25	23–25	28–26	13–15	109–106	3,547	Report

==== Tournament 12 ====
- Venue: SaZa Topsporthal Doetinchem Achterhoek, Doetinchem, Netherlands

Date	Time		Score		Set 1	Set 2	Set 3	Set 4	Set 5	Total	Attd	Report
12 Jun	19:30	Georgia	0–3	Netherlands	18–25	11–25	11–25			40–75	1,900	Report
13 Jun	16:30	Slovakia	3–0	Georgia	25–11	25–12	25–16			75–39	45	Report
14 Jun	16:00	Netherlands	3–0	Slovakia	26–24	25–20	25–18			76–62	1,950	Report

==== Tournament 13 ====
- Venue: Mioveni Sports Hall, Mioveni, Romania

Date	Time		Score		Set 1	Set 2	Set 3	Set 4	Set 5	Total	Attd	Report
12 Jun	19:00	Azerbaijan	0–3	Romania	23–25	12–25	7–25			42–75	150	Report
13 Jun	19:00	Spain	3–0	Azerbaijan	25–17	25–16	25–20			75–53	50	Report
14 Jun	19:00	Romania	3–2	Spain	25–18	23–25	21–25	25–18	15–9	109–95	300	Report

==== Tournament 14 ====
- Venue: Melina Mercouri Rentis Indoor Gymnasium, Agios Ioannis Renti, Greece

Date	Time		Score		Set 1	Set 2	Set 3	Set 4	Set 5	Total	Attd	Report
12 Jun	20:00	Iceland	0–3	Greece	14–25	13–25	12–25			39–75	1,050	Report
13 Jun	19:00	North Macedonia	3–0	Iceland	25–21	25–23	25–19			75–63	100	Report
14 Jun	19:00	Greece	3–0	North Macedonia	25–19	25–20	25–23			75–62	1,900	Report

==== Tournament 15 ====
- Venue: Centro de Desportos e Congressos de Matosinhos, Matosinhos, Portugal

Date	Time		Score		Set 1	Set 2	Set 3	Set 4	Set 5	Total	Attd	Report
12 Jun	21:00	Montenegro	0–3	Portugal	16–25	19–25	14–25			49–75	1,050	Report
13 Jun	17:00	Latvia	1–3	Montenegro	25–21	22–25	19–25	22–25		88–96	46	Report
14 Jun	16:30	Portugal	3–1	Latvia	25–19	20–25	25–23	25–18		95–85	1,570	Report

==== Tournament 16 ====
- Venue: Park Sports Hall, Strumica, North Macedonia

Date	Time		Score		Set 1	Set 2	Set 3	Set 4	Set 5	Total	Attd	Report
12 Jun	18:00	Norway	2–3	Israel	18–25	17–25	25–17	25–23	10–15	95–105		Report
13 Jun	18:00	Sweden	3–1	Norway	26–24	22–25	25–18	25–21		98–88		Report
14 Jun	18:00	Israel	3–1	Sweden	25–16	25–20	22–25	25–11		97–72		Report

==== Tournament 17 ====
- Venue: Pilatus Arena, Kriens, Switzerland

Date	Time		Score		Set 1	Set 2	Set 3	Set 4	Set 5	Total	Attd	Report
12 Jun	18:30	Luxembourg	0–3	Switzerland	22–25	20–25	20–25			62–75	940	Report
13 Jun	18:30	Hungary	3–0	Luxembourg	25–21	25–18	25–21			75–60	190	Report
14 Jun	18:30	Switzerland	3–0	Hungary	25–16	25–21	25–21			75–58	2,500	Report

==== Tournament 18 ====
- Venue: Kalev Sports Hall, Tallinn, Estonia

Date	Time		Score		Set 1	Set 2	Set 3	Set 4	Set 5	Total	Attd	Report
12 Jun	18:00	Kosovo	0–3	Estonia	13–25	13–25	9–25			35–75	685	Report
13 Jun	16:00	Austria	3–0	Kosovo	25–19	25–18	25–12			75–49	50	Report
14 Jun	16:00	Estonia	3–1	Austria	25–22	23–25	26–24	25–22		99–93	1,667	Report

=== Week 3 ===
==== Tournament 19 ====
- Venue: Digranes Sports Hall, Kópavogur, Iceland

Date	Time		Score		Set 1	Set 2	Set 3	Set 4	Set 5	Total	Attd	Report
19 Jun	19:00	Slovakia	3–0	Iceland	25–10	25–12	25–16			75–38	132	Report
20 Jun	19:00	Finland	3–1	Slovakia	25–18	23–25	25–17	25–20		98–80	97	Report
21 Jun	19:00	Iceland	0–3	Finland	14–25	15–25	12–25			41–75	165	Report

==== Tournament 20 ====
- Venue: (Georgia (country)) Tbilisi New Sports Palace, Tbilisi, Georgia

Date	Time		Score		Set 1	Set 2	Set 3	Set 4	Set 5	Total	Attd	Report
19 Jun	16:00	Spain	3–0	Georgia	25–18	25–14	25–8			75–40	150	Report
20 Jun	16:00	Czech Republic	3–1	Spain	25–19	25–20	22–25	25–22		97–86	36	Report
21 Jun	16:00	Georgia	0–3	Czech Republic	5–25	13–25	20–25			38–75	150	Report

==== Tournament 21 ====
- Venue: SD Mirsad Hurić, Goražde, Bosnia and Herzegovina

Date	Time		Score		Set 1	Set 2	Set 3	Set 4	Set 5	Total	Attd	Report
19 Jun	17:00	Croatia	3–0	Bosnia and Herzegovina	25–16	25–23	25–20			75–59	350	Report
20 Jun	17:00	Netherlands	3–0	Croatia	25–17	25–19	25–23			75–59	55	Report
21 Jun	17:00	Bosnia and Herzegovina	0–3	Netherlands	16–25	18–25	19–25			53–75	135	Report

==== Tournament 22 ====
- Venue: Tirana Olympic Park, Tirana, Albania

Date	Time		Score		Set 1	Set 2	Set 3	Set 4	Set 5	Total	Attd	Report
19 Jun	19:00	Denmark	3–0	Albania	25–17	25–18	25–21			75–56	368	Report
20 Jun	19:00	Romania	0–3	Denmark	19–25	17–25	15–25			51–75	59	Report
21 Jun	19:00	Albania	3–1	Romania	25–23	25–19	17–25	25–16		92–83	164	Report

==== Tournament 23 ====
- Venue: d'Coque, Luxembourg City, Luxembourg

Date	Time		Score		Set 1	Set 2	Set 3	Set 4	Set 5	Total	Attd	Report
19 Jun	19:30	Austria	3–0	Luxembourg	25–14	25–12	25–15			75–41	320	Report
20 Jun	18:30	Greece	3–1	Austria	25–16	23–25	25–22	25–18		98–81	235	Report
21 Jun	17:30	Luxembourg	0–3	Greece	22–25	22–25	31–33			75–83	820	Report

==== Tournament 24 ====
- Venue: A.Y.S. Sport Hall, Baku, Azerbaijan

Date	Time		Score		Set 1	Set 2	Set 3	Set 4	Set 5	Total	Attd	Report
19 Jun	18:00	Hungary	3–1	Azerbaijan	25–19	22–25	29–27	25–16		101–87	900	Report
20 Jun	18:00	Portugal	0–3	Hungary	18–25	23–25	22–25			63–75	70	Report
21 Jun	18:00	Azerbaijan	1–3	Portugal	25–21	16–25	12–25	19–25		72–96	400	Report

==== Tournament 25 ====
- Venue: Pallati i Rinisë, Pristina, Kosovo

Date	Time		Score		Set 1	Set 2	Set 3	Set 4	Set 5	Total	Attd	Report
19 Jun	20:00	North Macedonia	3–0	Kosovo	25–12	25–19	27–25			77–56	600	Report
20 Jun	20:00	Israel	3–0	North Macedonia	25–19	25–19	25–14			75–52	100	Report
21 Jun	20:00	Kosovo	1–3	Israel	26–24	18–25	21–25	16–25		81–99	250	Report

==== Tournament 26 ====
- Venue: Volda Campus Sparebank1 Arena, Volda, Norway

Date	Time		Score		Set 1	Set 2	Set 3	Set 4	Set 5	Total	Attd	Report
19 Jun	19:00	Latvia	3–1	Norway	21–25	29–27	25–18	25–21		100–91	720	Report
20 Jun	17:00	Switzerland	3–2	Latvia	17–25	25–20	25–18	21–25	15–12	103–100	125	Report
21 Jun	16:00	Norway	0–3	Switzerland	20–25	23–25	20–25			63–75	755	Report

==== Tournament 27 ====
- Venue: Nikoljac Sport Hall, Bijelo Polje, Montenegro

Date	Time		Score		Set 1	Set 2	Set 3	Set 4	Set 5	Total	Attd	Report
19 Jun	18:00	Sweden	3–1	Montenegro	22–25	25–20	25–19	25–14		97–78	170	Report
20 Jun	18:00	Estonia	2–3	Sweden	17–25	25–22	18–25	25–16	10–15	95–103	50	Report
21 Jun	20:00	Montenegro	0–3	Estonia	22–25	20–25	18–25			60–75	70	Report

=== Results by round ===
The table listed the results of teams in each round.

Win	Loss

Team ╲ Round	1	2	3	4	5	6
Finland	W	W	W	W	W	W
Czech Republic	W	W	W	L	W	W
Netherlands	W	W	W	W	W	W
Romania	L	W	W	W	L	L
Greece	L	W	W	W	W	W
Portugal	L	W	W	W	L	W
Israel	W	W	W	W	W	W
Switzerland	L	W	W	W	W	W
Estonia	W	W	W	W	L	W
Slovakia	L	W	W	L	W	L
Spain	W	W	W	L	W	L
Croatia	L	W	W	L	W	L
Denmark	W	W	W	W	W	W
Sweden	W	W	W	L	W	W
Latvia	W	W	L	L	W	L
North Macedonia	L	W	W	L	W	L
Hungary	L	W	W	L	W	W
Austria	L	L	W	L	W	L
Montenegro	L	W	L	W	L	L
Norway	L	L	L	L	L	L
Luxembourg	L	L	L	L	L	L
Kosovo	L	L	L	L	L	L
Azerbaijan	L	L	L	L	L	L
Iceland	L	L	L	L	L	L
Georgia	L	L	L	L	L	L
Bosnia and Herzegovina	L	L	L	L	L	L
Albania	L	L	L	L	L	W

Source: CEV

== Final round ==
- All times are local.

Semifinals
27 June & 28 June
Netherlands	3	3
Israel	1	1
28 June & 1 July
Finland	3	3
Denmark	1	1

Final
8 July & 11 July
Netherlands	1	1
Finland	3	3

=== Semifinals ===
Venues

- Odense Idrætshal, Odense, Denmark
- AGCO Power Arena, Nokia, Finland
- SaZa Topsporthal Doetinchem Achterhoek, Doetinchem, Netherlands

Team 1	Agg.	Team 2	1st leg	2nd leg
Netherlands	2–0	Israel	3–1	3–1
Finland	2–0	Denmark	3–1	3–1

Date	Time		Score		Set 1	Set 2	Set 3	Set 4	Set 5	Total	Attd	Report
27 Jun	15:00	Israel	1–3	Netherlands	23–25	30–28	23–25	19–25		95–103	550	Report
28 Jun	13:00	Netherlands	3–1	Israel	25–14	18–25	25–22	25–19		93–80	850	Report
28 Jun	17:00	Denmark	1–3	Finland	25–16	20–25	22–25	20–25		87–91	565	Report
1 Jul	18:15	Finland	3–1	Denmark	22–25	25–22	25–19	25–22		97–88	2,016	Report

=== Final ===
Venues

- AGCO Power Arena, Nokia, Finland
- Sportcampus Zuiderpark, Den Haag, Netherlands

Team 1	Agg.	Team 2	1st leg	2nd leg
Netherlands	0–2	Finland	1–3	1–3

Date	Time		Score		Set 1	Set 2	Set 3	Set 4	Set 5	Total	Attd	Report
8 Jul	18:15	Finland	3–1	Netherlands	27–25	23–25	25–23	25–13		100–86	2,112	Report
11 Jul	19:30	Netherlands	1–3	Finland	15–25	25–20	18–25	21–25		79–95	1,988	Report

== Final standing ==
2026 European League champions

Finland
2nd title

Pos	Team	Pld	W	L	Pts	SW	SL	SR	SPW	SPL	SPR	Qualification
1st place, gold medalist(s)	Finland	10	10	0	30	30	7	4.286	913	735	1.242	Qualified for the 2028 European Championship
2nd place, silver medalist(s)	Netherlands	10	8	2	24	24	8	3.000	812	700	1.160	Qualified for the 2028 European Championship
3rd place, bronze medalist(s)	Denmark	8	6	2	17	18	9	2.000	676	589	1.148	Qualified for the 2028 European Championship
4	Israel	8	6	2	17	20	11	1.818	720	623	1.156	Qualified for the 2028 European Championship
5	Greece	6	5	1	16	17	4	4.250	512	415	1.234	
6	Estonia	6	5	1	16	17	4	4.250	501	429	1.168	
7	Czech Republic	6	5	1	16	17	5	3.400	529	409	1.293	
8	Switzerland	6	5	1	14	16	5	3.200	499	443	1.126	
9	Sweden	6	5	1	13	16	9	1.778	554	515	1.076	
10	Spain	6	4	2	13	15	7	2.143	505	452	1.117	
11	Hungary	6	4	2	12	12	7	1.714	434	418	1.038	
12	Portugal	6	4	2	12	13	8	1.625	487	426	1.143	
13	Latvia	6	3	3	10	13	10	1.300	523	496	1.054	
14	Slovakia	6	3	3	9	10	9	1.111	443	395	1.122	
15	Croatia	6	3	3	9	10	9	1.111	434	406	1.069	
16	North Macedonia	6	3	3	9	9	10	0.900	425	423	1.005	
17	Romania	6	3	3	8	10	11	0.909	458	430	1.065	
18	Austria	6	2	4	6	10	12	0.833	476	478	0.996	
19	Montenegro	6	2	4	6	8	14	0.571	452	512	0.883	
20	Albania	6	1	5	3	3	16	0.188	392	474	0.827	
21	Norway	6	0	6	1	5	18	0.278	471	551	0.855	
22	Azerbaijan	6	0	6	0	2	18	0.111	354	497	0.712	
23	Luxembourg	6	0	6	0	1	18	0.056	372	481	0.773	
24	Kosovo	6	0	6	0	1	18	0.056	318	476	0.668	
25	Bosnia and Herzegovina	6	0	6	0	0	18	0.000	345	452	0.763	
26	Iceland	6	0	6	0	0	18	0.000	273	450	0.607	
27	Georgia	6	0	6	0	0	18	0.000	247	450	0.549	

== See also ==
- 2026 Men's European Volleyball Championship
- 2026 AVC Men's Volleyball Cup
