= Finland men's national volleyball team =

Men's national volleyball team representing Finland

Finland
- Nickname(s): Veljekset (Brothers)
- Association: Finnish Volleyball Association (FVA)
- Confederation: CEV
- Head coach: Olli Kunnari
- FIVB ranking: 16 (3 August 2026)

Uniforms
Home	Away	Third

World Championship
- Appearances: 9 (First in 1952)
- Best result: 9th place (2014)

European Championship
- Appearances: 21 (First in 1955)
- Best result: (2026)
- www.lentopalloliitto.fi/en (in English)
Honours
European Championship
Bronze medal – third place	2026 Italy/Bulgaria/Finland/Romania	Team
European League
Gold medal – first place	2025 Brno
Gold medal – first place	2026 Nokia / Den Haag
Silver medal – second place	2005 Kazan

The Finland men's national volleyball team is the national volleyball team of Finland. It is governed by the Finland Volleyball Association and takes part in international volleyball competitions. The team's best results to date are third place at the European Championships 2026 and ninth place at the 2014 World Championships. After a one-off appearance in 1993, Finland rejoined the FIVB World League in 2006 and was a part of the competition until 2017, when the Volleyball Nations League replaced the World League. Their best finish was seventh place in 2007. In 2026, Finland qualified for the 2027 Volleyball Nations League for the first time.

== Competition record ==
=== Olympic Games ===
Olympic Games record					Qualification record			
Year	Round	GP	MW	ML	Year	GP	MW	ML
(Japan) 1964	Did not qualify				1963 European Championship			
(Mexico) 1968	Did not qualify				1967 European Championship			
(West Germany) 1972	Did not qualify				1971 European Championship			
(Canada) 1976	Did not qualify				Did not qualify			
(Soviet Union) 1980	Did not qualify				Did not qualify			
(United States) 1984	Did not qualify				1983 European Championship			
(South Korea) 1988	Did not qualify				Did not qualify			
(Spain) 1992	Did not qualify				1991 European Championship			
(United States) 1996	Did not qualify				Did not qualify			
(Australia) 2000	Did not qualify				2000	3	1	2
(Greece) 2004	Did not qualify				2004	7	3	4
(China) 2008	Did not qualify				2008	8	5	3
(United Kingdom) 2012	Did not qualify				2012	7	4	3
(Brazil) 2016	Did not qualify				2016	3	0	3
(Japan) 2020	Did not qualify				2019	3	0	3
(France) 2024	Did not qualify				2023	7	2	5
(United States) 2028	Future event				Future event			
(Australia) 2032	Future event				Future event			
Total	0/7	0	0	0	Total	38	15	23

=== World Championship ===
World Championship record
Year	Round	Position	GP	MW	ML	SW	SL	Squad
(Czechoslovakia) 1949	Did not qualify							
(Soviet Union) 1952	7th–11th places	11th	7	0	7	1	21	Squad
(France) 1956	Did not qualify							
(Brazil) 1960	Did not qualify							
(Soviet Union) 1962	11th–20th places	18th	10	1	9	7	27	Squad
(Czechoslovakia) 1966	17th–22nd places	19th	9	3	6	13	20	Squad
(Bulgaria) 1970	17th–24th places	20th	12	4	8	20	26	Squad
(Mexico) 1974	Did not qualify							
(Italy) 1978	17th–20th places	17th	10	4	6	20	21	Squad
(Argentina) 1982	17th–20th places	17th	10	4	6	19	19	Squad
(France) 1986	Did not qualify							
(Brazil) 1990	Did not qualify							
(Greece) 1994	Did not qualify							
(Japan) 1998	Did not qualify							
(Argentina) 2002	Did not qualify							
(Japan) 2006	Did not qualify							
(Italy) 2010	Did not qualify							
(Poland) 2014	Second round	9th	12	5	7	19	25	Squad
(Italy) (Bulgaria) 2018	Second round	16th	8	2	6	10	21	Squad
(Poland) (Slovenia) 2022	Did not qualify							
(Philippines) 2025	Round of 16	15th	4	2	2	8	9	Squad
(Poland) 2027	Qualified							
(Qatar) 2029	Future event							
Total	9/23		82	25	57	117	189	—

=== FIVB World League ===
FIVB World League
Year	Position
1990–1992	did not qualify
(Brazil) 1993	12th
1994–2005	did not qualify
(Russia) 2006	10th
(Poland) 2007	7th
(Brazil) 2008	10th
(Serbia) 2009	8th
(Argentina) 2010	13th
(Poland) 2011	10th
(Bulgaria) 2012	13th
(Argentina) 2013	16th
(Italy) 2014	16th
(Brazil) 2015	15th
(Poland) 2016	17th
(Brazil) 2017	21st

=== Nations League ===
Nations League record
Year	Round	Position	GP	MW	ML	SW	SL	Squad
(France) 2018	Did not qualify							
(United States) 2019	Did not qualify							
(Italy) 2021	Did not qualify							
(Italy) 2022	Did not qualify							
(Poland) 2023	Did not qualify							
(Poland) 2024	Did not qualify							
(China) 2025	Did not qualify							
(China) 2026	Did not qualify							
(N/A) 2027	Qualified							
Total	0 Titles	1/9	—	—	—	—	—	—

=== European Championship ===
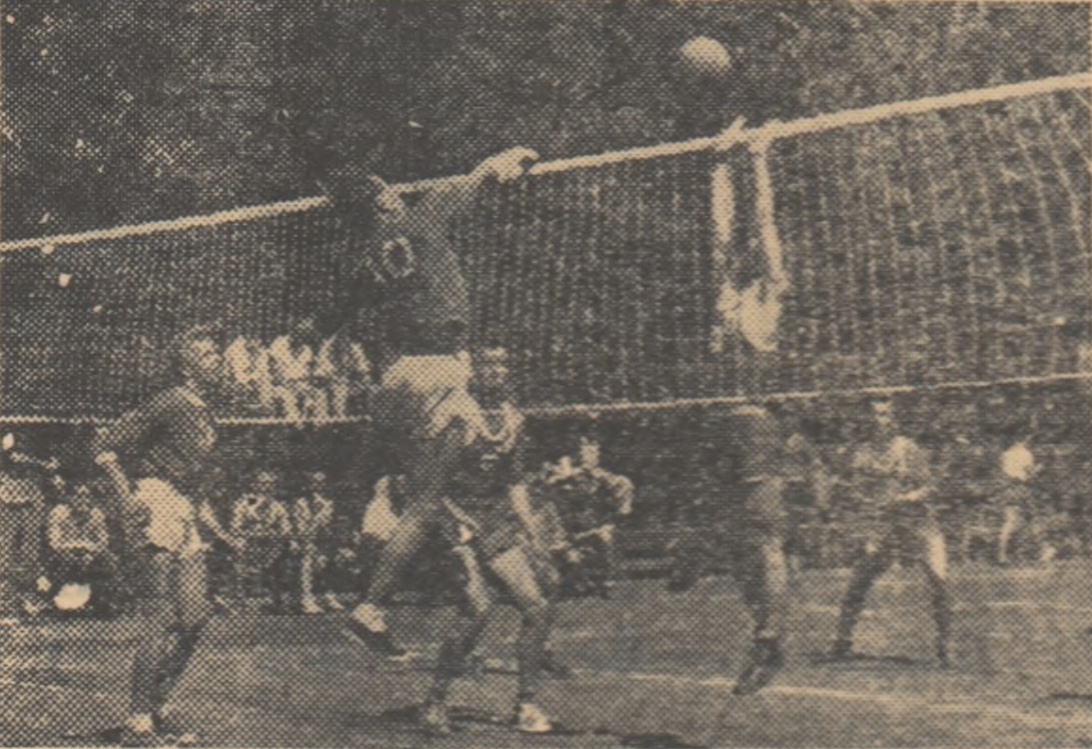
1955 European Championship, Finland - Austria

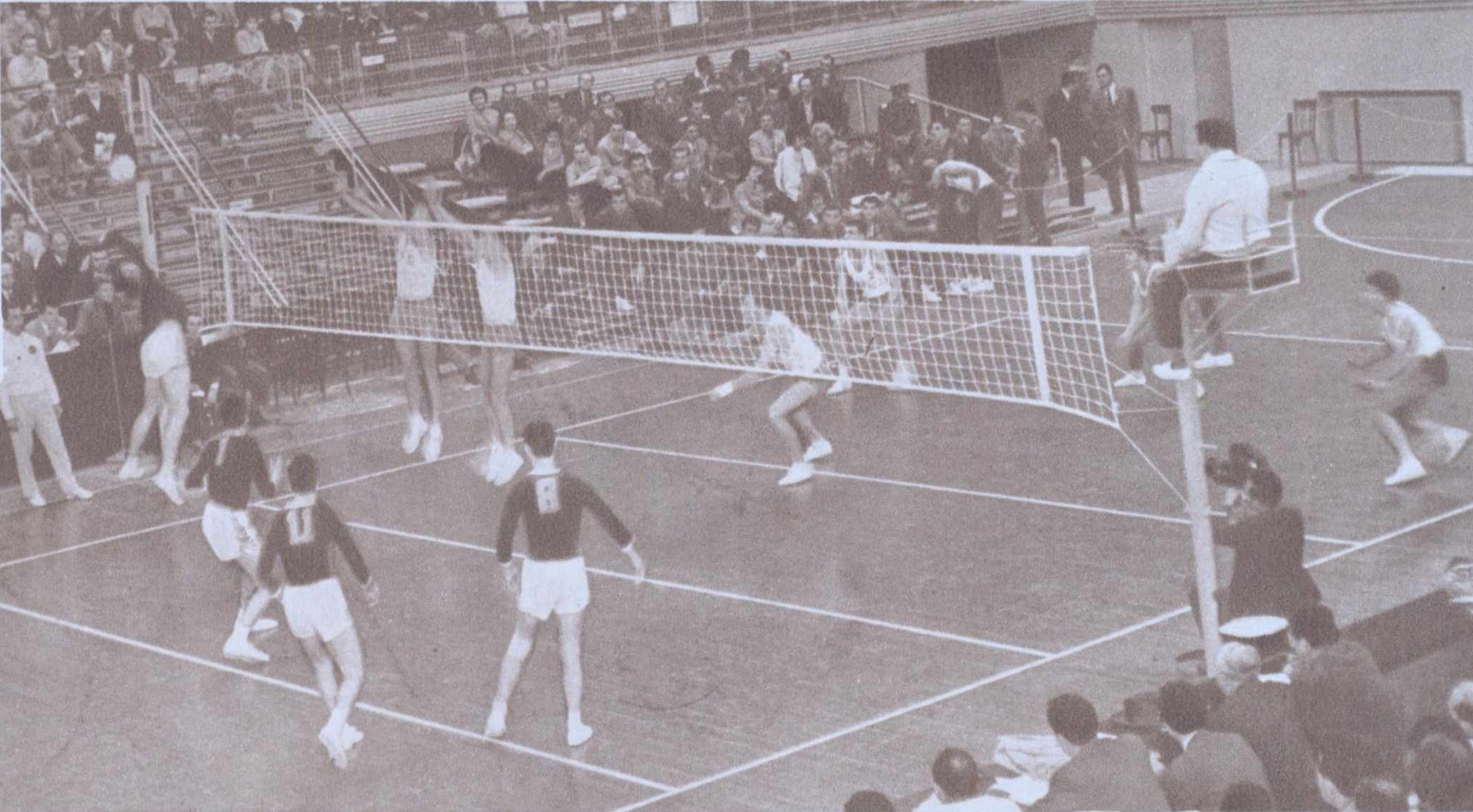
1963 European Championship, Finland - Romania

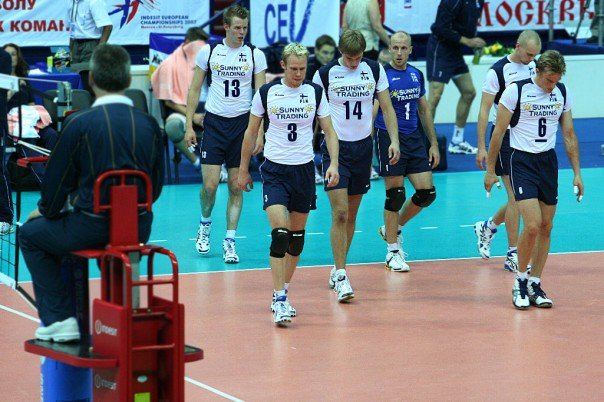
Finland national team at the European Championships in 2007

Finland national team at the European Championships in 2026

European Championship
Year	Round	Position
1948–1951	did not qualify	
(Romania) 1955	Consolation round 9-14th	11th
(Czechoslovakia) 1958	Consolation round 9-16th	14th
(Romania) 1963	Consolation round 9-17th	14th
(Turkey) 1967	Consolation round 17-20th	17th
(Italy) 1971	Consolation round 13-17th	13th
(Socialist Federal Republic of Yugoslavia) 1975	did not qualify	
(Finland) 1977	Consolation round 9-12th	11th
(France) 1979	did not qualify	
(Bulgaria) 1981	Consolation round 7-12th	9th
(East Germany) 1983	Consolation round 7-12th	7th
1985–1989	did not qualify	
(Germany) 1991	Consolation round 5-8th	8th
(Finland) 1993	Preliminary Round	10th
(Greece) 1995	did not qualify	
(Netherlands) 1997	Preliminary Round	11th
1999–2005	did not qualify	
(Russia) 2007	Semifinals	4th
(Turkey) 2009	Playoff Round	12th
(Austria) (Czech Republic) 2011	Quarterfinals	8th
(Denmark) (Poland) 2013	Quarterfinals	8th
(Bulgaria) (Italy) 2015	Playoff Round	12th
(Poland) 2017	Playoff Round	12th
(Belgium) (France) (Netherlands) (Slovenia) 2019	Round of 16	14th
(Finland) (Estonia) (Czech Republic) (Poland) 2021	Round of 16	12th
(Italy) (North Macedonia) (Bulgaria) (Israel) 2023	Preliminary Round	19th
(Bulgaria) (Finland) (Italy) (Romania) 2026	Semifinals	3rd
(Montenegro) (N/A) (N/A) (N/A) 2028	Qualified	

=== European League ===
European League
Year	Position
(Czech Republic) 2004	6th
(Russia) 2005	2nd place, silver medalist(s)
2006–2017	Competed in the FIVB World League
(Czech Republic) 2018	7th
(Estonia) 2019	11th
(Turkey) 2021	Did not enter
(Hungary) 2022	13th
(Croatia) 2023	6th
(Croatia) 2024	7th
(Czech Republic) 2025	1st place, gold medalist(s)
(Finland) (Netherlands) 2026	1st place, gold medalist(s)
2027–	Competed in the FIVB Nations League

=== Memorial of Hubert Jerzy Wagner ===
Memorial of Hubert Jerzy Wagner
Year	Position
(Poland) 2019	4th

== Team ==
=== Current squad ===
The following is Finland's roster for the 2025 FIVB Men's Volleyball World Championship.

- 1 Antti Ronkainen OH
- 2 Eemi Tervaportti S
- 6 Petteri Tyynismaa MB
- 7 Niko Suihkonen OH
- 8 Voitto Köykkä L
- 10 Luka Marttila OH
- 11 Miika Haapaniemi MB
- 13 Joonas Mikael Jokela OP
- 17 Severi Savonsalmi MB
- 19 Niklas Aleksi Breilin L
- 21 Veikka Lindqvist OP
- 24 Nooa Marttila OH
- 25 Juho Kaunisto MB
- 33 Fedor Ivanov S

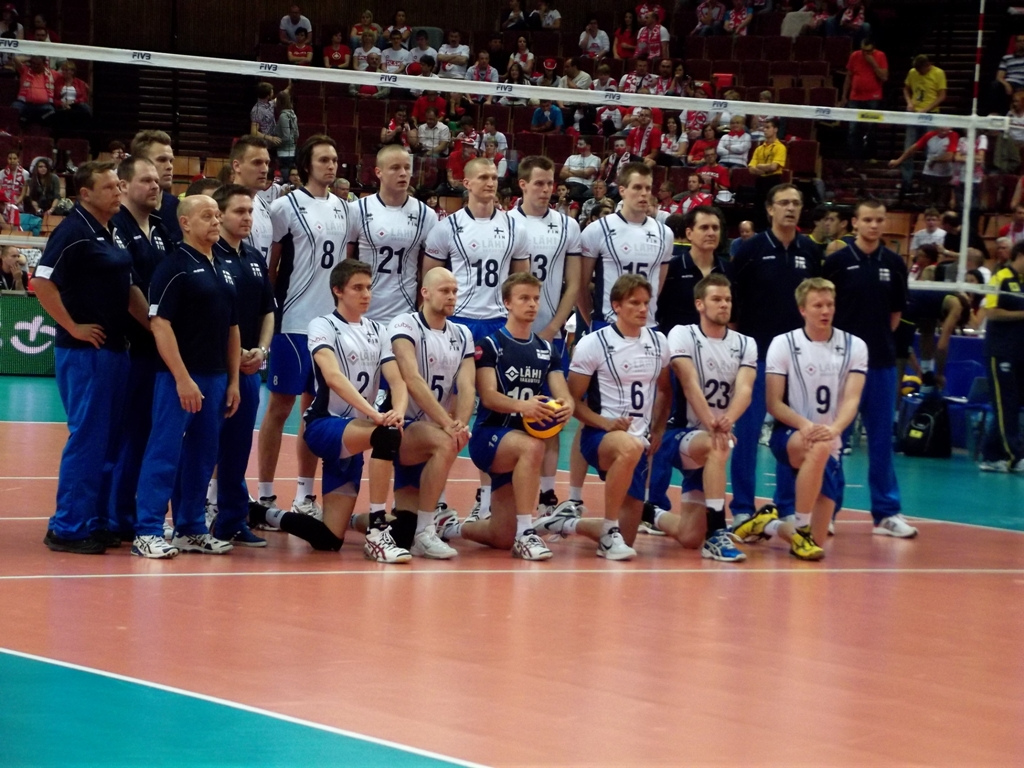
Finland national volleyball team in 2012.

Staff

- Head coach: Olli Kunnari (Finland)
- Assistant coach: Matti Alatalo (Finland)
- Assistant coach, physical coach: Marko Panu (Finland)
- Team manager: Jarmo Korhonen (Finland)
- Scoutman: Kamil Sołoducha (Poland)
- Doctor: Krista Tapaninaho (Finland)
- Media manager: Toni Flink (Finland)

== See also ==
- Finland men's national under-21 volleyball team
- Finland men's national under-19 volleyball team
- CEV U22 Volleyball European Championship
- CEV U17 Volleyball European Championship
