= Israel men's national volleyball team =

Men's national volleyball team representing Israel

Israel
- Association: איגוד הכדורעף בישראל; Israel Volleyball Association
- Confederation: CEV
- Head coach: Itamar Stein
- FIVB ranking: 35 ▼6 (1 October 2026)

Uniforms
Home	Away

Summer Olympics
- Appearances: 0

World Championship
- Appearances: 4 (First in 1952)
- Best result: 10th

European Championship
- Appearances: 5 (First in 1951)
- Best result: 10th
- www.iva.org.il (in Hebrew)
Honours
European League
Bronze medal – third place	2025 Brno	Team

The Israel men's national volleyball team represents Israel in international men's volleyball competitions and friendly matches. It is governed by the Israel Volleyball Association. Just like in other sports, even though Israel is geographically located in Asia, it competes in European competitions (CEV) due to the Arab boycott in the 1970s.

== Results ==
=== World Championship ===
World Championship record
Year	Position	Pld	W	L	SW	SL
(Czechoslovakia) 1949	Withdrew					
(Soviet Union) 1952	First round	7	2	5	8	15
(France) 1956	First round	11	5	6	18	21
(Brazil) 1960	Did not enter					
(Soviet Union) 1962	First round	11	5	6	19	21
(Czechoslovakia) 1966	Withdrew during qualification					
(Bulgaria) 1970	First round	11	4	7	15	22
1974 - 1994	Did not qualify					
1998 - 2025	Did not qualify					
(Poland) 2027	To be determined					
(Qatar) 2029	To be determined					
Total		40	16	24	60	79

=== European Championship ===
European Championship record
Year	Position	Pld	W	L	SW	SL
1948–1950	did not participate					
(France) 1951	10th place	5	0	5	2	15
1955–1963	did not participate					
(Turkey) 1967	11th place	10	6	4	21	15
(Italy) 1971	12th place	8	3	5	11	16
1975–1995	did not participate					
1997–2021	did not qualify					
(Italy) / (Bulgaria) / (North Macedonia) / (Israel) 2023	18th place	5	2	3	4	6
(Italy) / (Bulgaria) / (Finland) / (Romania) 2026	22nd place	5	1	4	5	14
(Montenegro) 2028	Qualified					
Total		33	12	21	43	66

=== European League ===
European League record
Year	Position	Pld	W	L	SW	SL
2004 - 2011	did not participate					
(Turkey) 2012	6th place	12	5	7	20	27
(Turkey) 2013	10th place	12	4	8	15	27
(Greece) (Montenegro) 2014	did not participate					
(Poland) 2015	11th place	10	1	9	7	27
(Bulgaria) 2016	did not participate					
(Denmark) 2017	7th place	6	1	5	6	16
(Czech Republic) 2018	did not participate					
(Estonia) 2019	did not participate					
(Belgium) 2021	16th place	6	2	4	10	14
(Croatia) 2022	did not participate					
(Croatia) 2023	did not participate					
(Croatia) 2024	13th place	7	7	0	21	4
(Czech Republic) 2025	3rd place	8	7	1	21	10
(Finland) (Netherlands) 2026	4th place	8	6	2	20	11
Total		69	33	36	120	136

== See also ==
- Israel women's national volleyball team
- Sport in Israel
