= 1958 Men's European Volleyball Championship =

Season of the European Men's Volleyball Championship

Tournament details
- Host country: Czechoslovakia
- Dates: August 30 – September 11
- Teams: 20
- Venue: 1 (in 1 host city)

Final positions
- Champions: Czechoslovakia (3rd title)

The 1958 Men's European Volleyball Championship was the fifth edition of the event, organized by Europe's governing volleyball body, the Confédération Européenne de Volleyball. It was hosted in Prague, Czechoslovakia from August 30 to September 11, 1958.

== Teams ==
- Albania
- Austria
- Belgium
- Bulgaria
- Czechoslovakia
- Denmark
- Egypt
- Finland
- France
- East Germany
- RFA
- Italy
- Yugoslavia
- Netherlands
- Poland
- Romania
- Tunisia
- Turkey
- Hungary
- USSR

== Final ranking ==
Place	Team
1st place, gold medalist(s)	Czechoslovakia
2nd place, silver medalist(s)	Romania
3rd place, bronze medalist(s)	Soviet Union
4	Bulgaria
5	Hungary
6	Poland
7	Yugoslavia
8	France
9	East Germany
10	Italy
11	Albania
12	Turkey
13	Netherlands
14	Finland
15	Egypt
16	Tunisia
17	Belgium
18	Austria
19	West Germany
20	Denmark

1958 Men's European champions

Czechoslovakia
Third title
