= 1963 Men's European Volleyball Championship =

Tournament details
- Host country: Romania
- Dates: October 21–November 2
- Teams: 17
- Venues: 4 (in 4 host cities)

Final positions
- Champions: Romania (1st title)

The 1963 Men's European Volleyball Championship was the sixth edition of the event, organized by Europe's governing volleyball body, the Confédération Européenne de Volleyball. It was hosted in various cities in Romania from October 21 to November 2, 1963, with the final taking place in Bucharest.

== Teams ==
- Austria
- Belgium
- Bulgaria
- Czechoslovakia
- Denmark
- Finland
- France
- East Germany
- West Germany
- Italy
- Yugoslavia
- Netherlands
- Poland
- Romania
- Turkey
- Hungary
- USSR

== Final ranking ==
| Place | Team |
|---|---|
| 1st place, gold medalist(s) | Romania |
| 2nd place, silver medalist(s) | Hungary |
| 3rd place, bronze medalist(s) | Soviet Union |
| 4. | Bulgaria |
| 5. | Czechoslovakia |
| 6. | Poland |
| 7. | Yugoslavia |
| 8. | France |
| 9. | East Germany |
| 10. | Italy |
| 11. | Turkey |
| 12. | Netherlands |
| 13. | Belgium |
| 14. | Finland |
| 15. | West Germany |
| 16. | Austria |
| 17. | Denmark |

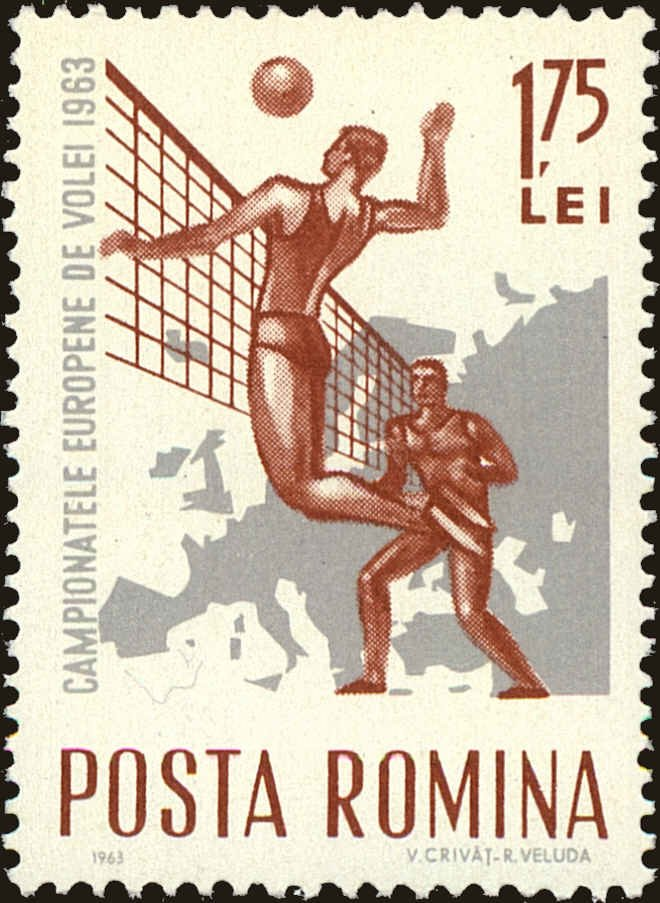

1963 Men's European champions

Romania
First title
