= Men's European Volleyball League =

- Most recent season or competition: 2026 Men's European Volleyball League
- Sport: Volleyball
- Founded: 2004; 22 years ago
- First season: 2004
- Continent: Europe (CEV)
- Most recent champions: Finland (2nd title)
- Most titles: Turkey (3 titles)

The Men's European Volleyball League is a continental volleyball competition senior men's national volleyball teams of Europe, organized by the European Volleyball Confederation (CEV). Created in 2004, the competition serves as a qualifying tournament for the FIVB World League (until 2016) and its successor the FIVB Challenger Cup from 2018 to 2024.

This event should not be confused with the other, more prestigious, continental competition for European national volleyball teams, the European Volleyball Championship.

== Results summary ==
Year	Finals hosts	Final			Third place match (or losing semi-finalists)			Teams
Year	Finals hosts	Champions	Score	Runners-up	3rd place	Score	4th place	Teams
2004; Details	(Czech Republic); Opava	Czech Republic	3–1	Russia	Netherlands	3–1	Germany	8
2005; Details	(Russia); Kazan	Russia	3–0	Finland	Spain	3–1	Turkey	8
2006; Details	(Turkey); İzmir	Netherlands	3–1	Croatia	Greece	3–2	Turkey	8
2007; Details	(Portugal); Portimão	Spain	3–2	Portugal	Slovakia	3–1	Slovenia	12
2008; Details	(Turkey); Bursa	Slovakia	3–1	Netherlands	Turkey	3–2	Germany	9
2009; Details	(Portugal); Portimão	Germany	3–2	Spain	Portugal	3–0	Slovakia	12
2010; Details	(Spain); Guadalajara	Portugal	3–1	Spain	Turkey	3–2	Romania	8
2011; Details	(Slovakia); Košice	Slovakia	3–2	Spain	Slovenia	3–0	Romania	12
2012; Details	(Turkey); Ankara	Netherlands	3–2	Turkey	Spain	3–1	Slovakia	10
2013; Details	(Turkey); Marmaris	Belgium	3–0	Croatia	Czech Republic	3–1	Turkey	12
2014; Details	(Greece) Evosmos (Montenegro) Budva	Montenegro	5–1 (agg.) (3–2, 3–1)	Greece	Slovenia and Macedonia			10
2015; Details	(Poland); Wałbrzych	Slovenia	3–0	Macedonia	Poland	3–0	Estonia	12
2016; Details	(Bulgaria); Varna	Estonia	3–0	Macedonia	Austria	3–0	Bulgaria	8
2017; Details	(Denmark); Gentofte	Ukraine	3–1	Macedonia	Sweden	3–1	Denmark	8
2018; Details	(Czech Republic); Karlovy Vary	Estonia	3–0	Czech Republic	Turkey	3–2	Portugal	20
2019; Details	(Estonia); Tallinn	Turkey	3–0	Belarus	Netherlands	3–0	Estonia	20
2020	Cancelled due to the COVID-19 pandemic							
2021; Details	(Belgium); Kortrijk	Turkey	3–1	Ukraine	Estonia	3–0	Belgium	19
2022; Details	(Croatia); Varaždin	Czech Republic	3–1	Turkey	Croatia	3–2	Ukraine	17
2023; Details	(Croatia); Zadar	Turkey	3–2	Ukraine	Croatia	3–0	Czech Republic	18
2024; Details	(Croatia); Osijek	Ukraine	3–1	Croatia	Czech Republic	3–2	Estonia	16
2025; Details	(Czech Republic); Brno	Finland	3–1	Czech Republic	Israel	3–1	Greece	20
2026; Details	(Finland) Nokia (Netherlands) Den Haag	Finland	2–0 (agg.) (3–1, 3–1)	Netherlands	Denmark	(Note: Since there are no Final six round, no third place match will be played and the losers of the semifinals will be ranked third and fourth based on their results from the semifinals.)	Israel	27

== Medals summary ==
Rank	Nation	Gold	Silver	Bronze	Total
1	Turkey	3	2	3	8
2	Czech Republic	2	2	2	6
2	Netherlands	2	2	2	6
4	Ukraine	2	2	0	4
5	Finland	2	1	0	3
6	Estonia	2	0	1	3
6	Slovakia	2	0	1	3
8	Spain	1	3	2	6
9	Portugal	1	1	1	3
10	Russia	1	1	0	2
11	Slovenia	1	0	2	3
12	Belgium	1	0	0	1
12	Germany	1	0	0	1
12	Montenegro	1	0	0	1
15	Croatia	0	3	2	5
16	North Macedonia	0	3	1	4
17	Greece	0	1	1	2
18	Belarus	0	1	0	1
19	Austria	0	0	1	1
19	Denmark	0	0	1	1
19	Israel	0	0	1	1
19	Poland	0	0	1	1
19	Sweden	0	0	1	1
Totals (23 entries)		22	22	23	67

== MVP by edition ==
- 2004 – (Czech Republic) Petr Pláteník
- 2005 – (Russia) Pavel Abramov
- 2006 – (Netherlands) Guido Görtzen
- 2007 – (Spain) Guillermo Falasca
- 2008 – (Slovakia) Martin Sopko
- 2009 – (Germany) Jochen Schöps
- 2010 – (Portugal) Valdir Sequeira
- 2011 – (Slovakia) Tomas Kmet
- 2012 – (Turkey) Emre Batur
- 2013 – (Belgium) Bram Van den Dries
- 2014 – (Montenegro) Miloš Ćulafić
- 2015 – (Slovenia) Dejan Vinčič
- 2016 – (Estonia) Robert Täht
- 2017 – (Ukraine) Maksym Drozd
- 2018 – (Estonia) Renee Teppan
- 2019 – (Turkey) Arslan Ekşi
- 2021 – (Turkey) Adis Lagumdzija
- 2022 – (Czech Republic) Jan Galabov
- 2023 – (Turkey) Kaan Gürbüz
- 2024 – (Ukraine) Yevhenii Kisiliuk
- 2025 – (Finland) Joonas Jokela
- 2026 – (Finland) Luka Marttila

== See also ==
- Women's European Volleyball League
- Men's European Volleyball Championship
- FIVB Volleyball World League
- FIVB Men's Volleyball Nations League
