= ICDP =

ICDP may refer to

- International Confederation for Disarmament and Peace
- Integrated Conservation and Development Project
- International Continental Scientific Drilling Program
- Institut de Criminologie et de Droit Pénal de Paris
