= 2010 FIVB Men's Volleyball World Championship qualification =

- Dates: 10 July 2009 – 30 August 2009
- Teams: 109 (from 5 confederations)

24 teams competed in the 2010 FIVB Men's Volleyball World Championship, with two places allocated for the hosts, Italy and the titleholder, Brazil. In the qualification process for the 2010 FIVB World Championship, the Five FIVB confederations were allocated a share of the 22 remaining spots.

== Qualified teams ==
Team	Qualified as	Qualification date	Appearance in finals
Italy	Host country	22 December 2005	15th
Brazil	Defending Champions	3 December 2006	15th
Puerto Rico	NORCECA Pool G Winners	10 July 2009	3rd
Russia	CEV Pool I Winners	9 August 2009	5th
Germany	CEV Pool I Runners-up	9 August 2009	3rd
Venezuela	CSV Pool B Winners	12 August 2009	10th
China	AVC Pool G Winners	15 August 2009	12th
Australia	AVC Pool G Runners-up	15 August 2009	5th
Poland	CEV Pool K Winners	15 August 2009	15th
France	CEV Pool K Runners-up	15 August 2009	14th
Serbia	CEV Pool L Winners	15 August 2009	1st
Spain	CEV Pool L Runners-up	15 August 2009	3rd
Tunisia	CAVB Pool D Winners	16 August 2009	8th
Bulgaria	CEV Pool J Winners	16 August 2009	16th
Czech Republic	CEV Pool J Runners-up	16 August 2009	4th
Cuba	NORCECA Pool H Winners	16 August 2009	13th
United States	NORCECA Pool F Winners	17 August 2009	14th
Egypt	CAVB Pool C Winners	20 August 2009	7th
Cameroon	CAVB Pool E Winners	23 August 2009	2nd
Canada	NORCECA Pool I Winners	29 August 2009	9th
Mexico	NORCECA Pool I Runners-up	29 August 2009	4th
Japan	AVC Pool H Winners	30 August 2009	14th
Iran	AVC Pool H Runners-up	30 August 2009	4th
Argentina	CSV Pool A Winners	30 August 2009	10th

== Confederation qualification processes ==
The distribution by confederation for the 2010 FIVB Men's Volleyball World Championship was:

- Asia and Oceania (AVC): 4 places
- Africa (CAVB): 3 places
- Europe (CEV): 8 places (+ Italy qualified automatically as host nation for a total of 9 places)
- South America (CSV) 2 places (+ Brazil qualified automatically as the defending champions for a total of 3 places)
- North America (NORCECA): 5 places

=== AVC ===
- Australia (Third Round)
- Bangladesh (First Round, Second Round)
- China (Third Round)
- Chinese Taipei (Second Round)
- Fiji (First Round)
- India (Second Round, Third Round)
- Indonesia (Second Round)
- Iran (Second Round, Third Round)
- Japan (Third Round)
- Kazakhstan (Second Round, Third Round)
- Macau (First Round)
- Maldives (First Round)
- New Zealand (First Round)
- Oman (First Round, Second Round)
- Pakistan (First Round, Second Round)
- Qatar (First Round, Second Round)
- Samoa (First Round)
- South Korea (Third Round)
- Tonga (First Round, Second Round)
- Thailand (Second Round, Third Round)
- United Arab Emirates (First Round, Second Round)

=== CAVB ===
- Algeria (Second Round, Third Round)
- Botswana (Third Round)
- Cameroon (Third Round)
- Egypt (Third Round)
- Kenya (Third Round)
- Malawi (Second Round)
- Mauritius (Second Round, Third Round)
- Morocco (Second Round, Third Round)
- Mozambique (Second Round, Third Round)
- Nigeria (Second Round, Third Round)
- South Africa (Third Round)
- Tunisia (Third Round)
- Zimbabwe (Second Round, Third Round)

=== CEV ===
- Albania (First Round)
- Austria (First Round)
- Azerbaijan (First Round)
- Belarus (First Round, Second Round)
- Belgium (Second Round, Third Round)
- Bosnia and Herzegovina (First Round)
- Bulgaria (Third Round)
- Croatia (Second Round)
- Czech Republic (Second Round, Third Round)
- Denmark (Second Round)
- Estonia (Second Round, Third Round)
- Finland (Second Round, Third Round)
- France (Third Round)
- Germany (Second Round, Third Round)
- Great Britain (First Round)
- Greece (Second Round)
- Hungary (First Round)
- Israel (First Round)
- Latvia (First Round, Second Round)
- Moldova (First Round)
- Montenegro (First Round, Second Round)
- Netherlands (Second Round, Third Round)
- Norway (First Round)
- Poland (Third Round)
- Portugal (Second Round, Third Round)
- Romania (First Round, Second Round, Third Round)
- Russia (Third Round)
- Serbia (Third Round)
- Slovakia (Second Round, Third Round)
- Slovenia (Second Round, Third Round)
- Spain (Third Round)
- Sweden (First Round)
- Turkey (Second Round)
- Ukraine (Second Round)

=== CSV ===
- Argentina (Third Round)
- Bolivia (Third Round)
- Chile (Third Round)
- Colombia (Third Round)
- Ecuador (Third Round)
- Paraguay (Third Round)
- Uruguay (Third Round)
- Venezuela (Third Round)

=== NORCECA ===
- Anguilla (First Round)
- Antigua and Barbuda (First Round, Second Round)
- Aruba (Second Round)
- Bahamas (Second Round, Third Round)
- Barbados (Third Round)
- Belize (Second Round)
- Bermuda (First Round)
- British Virgin Islands (First Round)
- Canada (Third Round, Playoff Round)
- Cayman Islands (Second Round)
- Costa Rica (Second Round)
- Cuba (Third Round)
- Dominica (First Round)
- Dominican Republic (Third Round, Playoff Round)
- El Salvador (Second Round)
- Grenada (First Round)
- Guatemala (Second Round, Third Round)
- Haiti (Second Round)
- Honduras (Second Round)
- Jamaica (Second Round)
- Mexico (Second Round, Third Round, Playoff Round)
- Montserrat (First Round)
- Netherlands Antilles (Second Round)
- Nicaragua (Second Round)
- Panama (Second Round, Third Round, Playoff Round)
- Puerto Rico (Third Round)
- Saint Kitts and Nevis (First Round)
- Saint Lucia (First Round, Second Round)
- Saint Vincent and the Grenadines (First Round)
- Suriname (Second Round, Third Round)
- Trinidad and Tobago (Second Round)
- U.S. Virgin Islands (Second Round, Third Round)
- United States (Third Round)
