= 2010 FIVB Men's Volleyball World Championship qualification (CSV) =

The CSV qualification for the 2010 FIVB Men's Volleyball World Championship saw member nations compete for two places at the finals in Italy.

== Draw ==
8 of the 12 CSV national teams entered qualification. The teams were distributed according to their position in the FIVB Senior Men's Rankings as of 5 January 2008 using the serpentine system for their distribution. (Rankings shown in brackets)

Third round

Pool A	Pool B
Argentina (6); Chile (31); Colombia (34); Bolivia (—)	Venezuela (20); Paraguay (30); Uruguay (51); Ecuador (92)

== Third round ==
=== Pool A ===
- Venue: Polideportivo Ave Fénix, San Luis, Argentina
- Dates: August 28–30, 2009
- All times are Argentina Time (UTC−03:00)

Pos	Team	Pld	W	L	Pts	SW	SL	SR	SPW	SPL	SPR
1	Argentina	3	3	0	6	9	0	MAX	225	147	1.531
2	Colombia	3	2	1	5	6	5	1.200	234	234	1.000
3	Chile	3	1	2	4	5	8	0.625	263	278	0.946
4	Bolivia	3	0	3	3	2	9	0.222	195	258	0.756

Date	Time		Score		Set 1	Set 2	Set 3	Set 4	Set 5	Total	Report
28 Aug	18:30	Chile	2–3	Colombia	25–17	25–23	23–25	18–25	11–15	102–105	P2 P3
28 Aug	21:00	Argentina	3–0	Bolivia	25–15	25–15	25–10			75–40	P2 P3
29 Aug	17:30	Bolivia	0–3	Colombia	18–25	16–25	23–25			57–75	P2 P3
29 Aug	20:00	Argentina	3–0	Chile	25–19	25–16	25–18			75–53	P2 P3
30 Aug	18:30	Bolivia	2–3	Chile	14–25	25–22	25–21	21–25	13–15	98–108	P2 P3
30 Aug	21:00	Argentina	3–0	Colombia	25–15	25–16	25–23			75–54	P2 P3

=== Pool B ===
- Venue: Domo Olímpico, Guárico, Venezuela
- Dates: August 10–12, 2009
- All times are Venezuelan Standard Time (UTC−04:30)

Pos	Team	Pld	W	L	Pts	SW	SL	SR	SPW	SPL	SPR
1	Venezuela	3	3	0	6	9	0	MAX	225	133	1.692
2	Paraguay	3	2	1	5	6	5	1.200	234	246	0.951
3	Uruguay	3	1	2	4	4	6	0.667	207	236	0.877
4	Ecuador	3	0	3	3	1	9	0.111	197	248	0.794

Date	Time		Score		Set 1	Set 2	Set 3	Set 4	Set 5	Total	Report
10 Aug	17:00	Ecuador	0–3	Uruguay	23–25	21–25	23–25			67–75	P2 P3
10 Aug	19:00	Paraguay	0–3	Venezuela	15–25	12–25	15–25			42–75	P2 P3
11 Aug	17:00	Uruguay	1–3	Paraguay	25–19	22–25	22–25	16–25		85–94	P2 P3
11 Aug	19:00	Venezuela	3–0	Ecuador	25–15	25–15	25–14			75–44	P2 P3
12 Aug	17:00	Paraguay	3–1	Ecuador	25–16	25–22	23–25	25–23		98–86	P2 P3
12 Aug	19:00	Uruguay	0–3	Venezuela	15–25	16–25	16–25			47–75	P2 P3
