= 2010 FIVB Men's Volleyball World Championship qualification (CEV) =

The CEV qualification for the 2010 FIVB Men's Volleyball World Championship saw member nations compete for eight places at the finals in Italy.

== Draw ==
35 of the 55 CEV national teams entered qualification. (Iceland later withdrew) The teams were distributed according to their position in the FIVB Senior Men's Rankings as of 5 January 2008 using the serpentine system for their distribution. (Rankings shown in brackets) Teams ranked 1–6 did not compete in the first and second rounds, and automatically qualified for the third round. Teams ranked 7–20 did not compete in the first round, and automatically qualified for the second round.

First round

Pool A	Pool B	Pool C	Pool D
Great Britain (61); ~~Iceland (—)~~; Israel (81)	Latvia (55); Sweden (—); Norway (92); Belarus (72)	Austria (61); Hungary (72); Romania (55); Bosnia and Herzegovina (92)	Albania (72); Azerbaijan (81); Moldova (92); Montenegro (—)

- Iceland withdrew and Belarus replaced Iceland in Pool A to balance the number of teams in each group.

Second round

Pool E	Pool F	Pool G	Pool H
Germany (19); Slovakia (46); Croatia (51); 1st Pool A	Netherlands (29); Turkey (42); Estonia (50); 1st Pool B	Greece (24); Portugal (39); Slovenia (49); Denmark (55); 1st Pool C	Czech Republic (27); Finland (22); Ukraine (46); Belgium (55); 1st Pool D

Third round

Pool I	Pool J	Pool K	Pool L
Russia (2); 1st Pool H 2nd Pool E 3rd Pool H	Bulgaria (4); 1st Pool G 1st Pool F 2nd Pool H	Poland (5); France (13); 1st Pool E 3rd Pool G	Spain (6); Serbia (8); 2nd Pool F 2nd Pool G

== First round ==
=== Pool A ===
- Venue: English Institute of Sport, Sheffield, United Kingdom
- Dates: January 2–4, 2009
- All times are Greenwich Mean Time (UTC±00:00)

Pos	Team	Pld	W	L	Pts	SW	SL	SR	SPW	SPL	SPR
1	Belarus	2	2	0	4	6	3	2.000	195	190	1.026
2	Israel	2	1	1	3	5	4	1.250	199	182	1.093
3	Great Britain	2	0	2	2	2	6	0.333	162	184	0.880

Date	Time		Score		Set 1	Set 2	Set 3	Set 4	Set 5	Total	Report
02 Jan	14:00	Great Britain	1–3	Israel	14–25	25–21	22–25	14–25		75–96	P2 P3
03 Jan	14:00	Israel	2–3	Belarus	26–24	19–25	25–18	22–25	11–15	103–107	P2 P3
04 Jan	14:00	Belarus	3–1	Great Britain	25–23	13–25	25–22	25–17		88–87	P2 P3

=== Pool B ===
- Venue: Olympic Sports Centre, Riga, Latvia
- Dates: January 2–4, 2009
- All times are Eastern European Time (UTC+02:00)

Pos	Team	Pld	W	L	Pts	SW	SL	SR	SPW	SPL	SPR
1	Latvia	2	1	1	3	5	3	1.667	185	158	1.171
2	Sweden	2	1	1	3	3	5	0.600	177	186	0.952
3	Norway	2	1	1	3	3	3	1.000	125	143	0.874

Date	Time		Score		Set 1	Set 2	Set 3	Set 4	Set 5	Total	Report
02 Jan	16:00	Norway	3–0	Sweden	26–24	25–21	25–23			76–68	P2 P3
03 Jan	14:00	Latvia	3–0	Norway	25–12	25–19	25–18			75–49	P2 P3
04 Jan	15:00	Sweden	3–2	Latvia	20–25	20–25	29–27	25–21	15–12	109–110	P2 P3

=== Pool C ===
- Venue: Budocenter, Vienna, Austria
- Dates: January 3–5, 2009
- All times are Central European Time (UTC+01:00)

Pos	Team	Pld	W	L	Pts	SW	SL	SR	SPW	SPL	SPR
1	Romania	3	3	0	6	9	2	4.500	261	231	1.130
2	Austria	3	2	1	5	6	3	2.000	218	200	1.090
3	Bosnia and Herzegovina	3	1	2	4	3	8	0.375	230	248	0.927
4	Hungary	3	0	3	3	4	9	0.444	263	293	0.898

Date	Time		Score		Set 1	Set 2	Set 3	Set 4	Set 5	Total	Report
03 Jan	17:50	Romania	3–2	Hungary	20–25	25–21	25–17	25–27	16–14	111–104	P2 P3
03 Jan	20:20	Austria	3–0	Bosnia and Herzegovina	25–21	25–21	25–22			75–64	P2 P3
04 Jan	17:50	Hungary	2–3	Bosnia and Herzegovina	25–21	25–18	21–25	16–25	11–15	98–104	P2 P3
04 Jan	20:20	Romania	3–0	Austria	25–23	25–22	25–20			75–65	P2 P3
05 Jan	17:50	Bosnia and Herzegovina	0–3	Romania	21–25	20–25	21–25			62–75	P2 P3
05 Jan	20:20	Austria	3–0	Hungary	25–15	28–26	25–20			78–61	P2 P3

=== Pool D ===
- Venue: Olympic and Leisure Complex, Quba, Azerbaijan
- Dates: January 9–11, 2009
- All times are Azerbaijan Time (UTC+04:00)

Pos	Team	Pld	W	L	Pts	SW	SL	SR	SPW	SPL	SPR
1	Montenegro	3	3	0	6	9	0	MAX	225	134	1.679
2	Albania	3	2	1	5	6	4	1.500	216	227	0.952
3	Moldova	3	1	2	4	4	8	0.500	243	262	0.927
4	Azerbaijan	3	0	3	3	2	9	0.222	204	265	0.770

Date	Time		Score		Set 1	Set 2	Set 3	Set 4	Set 5	Total	Report
09 Jan	16:00	Moldova	0–3	Montenegro	15–25	14–25	16–25			45–75	P2 P3
09 Jan	18:30	Azerbaijan	0–3	Albania	17–25	13–25	31–33			61–83	P2 P3
10 Jan	16:00	Albania	0–3	Montenegro	17–25	12–25	13–25			42–75	P2 P3
10 Jan	18:30	Moldova	3–2	Azerbaijan	25–14	22–25	25–16	17–25	18–16	107–96	P2 P3
11 Jan	16:00	Albania	3–1	Moldova	25–22	25–21	16–25	25–23		91–91	P2 P3
11 Jan	18:30	Montenegro	3–0	Azerbaijan	25–14	25–15	25–18			75–47	P2 P3

== Second round ==
=== Pool E ===
- Venue: Aréna Poprad, Poprad, Slovakia
- Dates: May 29–31, 2009
- All times are Central European Summer Time (UTC+02:00)

Pos	Team	Pld	W	L	Pts	SW	SL	SR	SPW	SPL	SPR
1	Slovakia	3	3	0	6	9	5	1.800	312	293	1.065
2	Germany	3	2	1	5	8	3	2.667	259	217	1.194
3	Belarus	3	1	2	4	5	7	0.714	263	282	0.933
4	Croatia	3	0	3	3	2	9	0.222	223	265	0.842

Date	Time		Score		Set 1	Set 2	Set 3	Set 4	Set 5	Total	Report
29 May	16:30	Croatia	0–3	Germany	13–25	23–25	12–25			48–75	P2 P3
29 May	19:00	Slovakia	3–2	Belarus	25–18	29–27	22–25	19–25	15–11	110–106	P2 P3
30 May	16:30	Belarus	0–3	Germany	25–27	21–25	18–25			64–77	P2 P3
30 May	19:00	Slovakia	3–1	Croatia	22–25	25–14	25–21	25–20		97–80	P2 P3
31 May	15:00	Croatia	1–3	Belarus	22–25	26–28	25–15	22–25		95–93	P2 P3
31 May	17:30	Germany	2–3	Slovakia	23–25	25–21	25–19	22–25	12–15	107–105	P2 P3

=== Pool F ===
- Venue: Topsportcentrum, Rotterdam, Netherlands
- Dates: May 30–June 1, 2009
- All times are Central European Summer Time (UTC+02:00)

Pos	Team	Pld	W	L	Pts	SW	SL	SR	SPW	SPL	SPR
1	Netherlands	3	3	0	6	9	3	3.000	275	241	1.141
2	Estonia	3	1	2	4	5	6	0.833	249	246	1.012
3	Turkey	3	1	2	4	6	8	0.750	295	307	0.961
4	Latvia	3	1	2	4	4	7	0.571	235	260	0.904

Date	Time		Score		Set 1	Set 2	Set 3	Set 4	Set 5	Total	Report
30 May	16:00	Netherlands	3–1	Latvia	25–16	25–21	18–25	25–21		93–83	P2 P3
30 May	19:00	Turkey	3–2	Estonia	25–20	14–25	22–25	28–26	18–16	107–112	P2 P3
31 May	16:00	Estonia	0–3	Netherlands	24–26	19–25	19–25			62–76	P2 P3
31 May	19:00	Latvia	3–1	Turkey	13–25	25–21	26–24	25–22		89–92	P2 P3
01 Jun	13:30	Estonia	3–0	Latvia	25–23	25–21	25–19			75–63	P2 P3
01 Jun	16:00	Netherlands	3–2	Turkey	19–25	25–16	22–25	25–17	15–13	106–96	P2 P3

=== Pool G ===
- Venue: Pavilhão Desportivo Municipal, Póvoa de Varzim, Portugal
- Dates: May 27–31, 2009
- All times are Western European Summer Time (UTC+01:00)

Pos	Team	Pld	W	L	Pts	SW	SL	SR	SPW	SPL	SPR
1	Portugal	4	3	1	7	9	5	1.800	329	290	1.134
2	Romania	4	3	1	7	11	5	2.200	362	329	1.100
3	Slovenia	4	2	2	6	9	7	1.286	351	342	1.026
4	Greece	4	2	2	6	8	8	1.000	363	366	0.992
5	Denmark	4	0	4	4	0	12	0.000	223	301	0.741

Date	Time		Score		Set 1	Set 2	Set 3	Set 4	Set 5	Total	Report
27 May	15:30	Greece	1–3	Slovenia	22–25	25–23	18–25	19–25		84–98	P2 P3
27 May	18:00	Portugal	3–0	Denmark	25–18	25–13	25–13			75–44	P2 P3
28 May	17:30	Slovenia	2–3	Romania	25–22	20–25	13–25	25–13	12–15	95–100	P2 P3
28 May	20:00	Portugal	3–1	Greece	25–21	18–25	25–20	25–22		93–88	P2 P3
29 May	17:30	Denmark	0–3	Greece	24–26	19–25	20–25			63–76	P2 P3
29 May	20:00	Portugal	0–3	Romania	22–25	21–25	23–25			66–75	P2 P3
30 May	15:30	Slovenia	3–0	Denmark	25–19	25–22	25–22			75–63	P2 P3
30 May	18:30	Greece	3–2	Romania	19–25	25–18	32–30	24–26	15–13	115–112	P2 P3
31 May	13:30	Romania	3–0	Denmark	25–12	25–23	25–18			75–53	P2 P3
31 May	16:00	Slovenia	1–3	Portugal	21–25	25–20	16–25	21–25		83–95	P2 P3

=== Pool H ===
- Venue: Tipsport Arena, Liberec, Czech Republic
- Dates: May 27–31, 2009
- All times are Central European Summer Time (UTC+02:00)

Pos	Team	Pld	W	L	Pts	SW	SL	SR	SPW	SPL	SPR
1	Finland	4	3	1	7	10	3	3.333	325	292	1.113
2	Czech Republic	4	3	1	7	11	7	1.571	427	414	1.031
3	Belgium	4	2	2	6	8	6	1.333	340	337	1.009
4	Ukraine	4	1	3	5	4	11	0.364	326	340	0.959
5	Montenegro	4	1	3	5	4	10	0.400	314	349	0.900

Date	Time		Score		Set 1	Set 2	Set 3	Set 4	Set 5	Total	Report
27 May	15:30	Ukraine	0–3	Belgium	19–25	23–25	20–25			62–75	P2 P3
27 May	18:00	Montenegro	1–3	Czech Republic	25–23	22–25	15–25	24–26		86–99	P2 P3
28 May	15:30	Finland	3–0	Montenegro	25–16	25–20	27–25			77–61	P2 P3
28 May	18:00	Czech Republic	2–3	Ukraine	25–23	20–25	25–21	19–25	10–15	99–109	P2 P3
29 May	15:30	Ukraine	0–3	Finland	23–25	22–25	20–25			65–75	P2 P3
29 May	18:00	Belgium	2–3	Czech Republic	29–27	26–28	26–28	25–20	17–19	123–122	P2 P3
30 May	15:30	Finland	3–0	Belgium	27–25	25–18	25–16			77–59	P2 P3
30 May	18:00	Montenegro	3–1	Ukraine	25–22	25–23	16–25	25–20		91–90	P2 P3
31 May	15:30	Belgium	3–0	Montenegro	33–31	25–23	25–22			83–76	P2 P3
31 May	18:00	Czech Republic	3–1	Finland	32–34	25–23	25–22	25–17		107–96	P2 P3

== Third round ==
=== Pool I ===
- Venue: Tampereen jäähalli, Tampere, Finland
- Dates: August 7–9, 2009
- All times are Eastern European Summer Time (UTC+03:00)

Pos	Team	Pld	W	L	Pts	SW	SL	SR	SPW	SPL	SPR
1	Russia	3	3	0	6	9	1	9.000	244	200	1.220
2	Germany	3	2	1	5	7	4	1.750	257	245	1.049
3	Finland	3	1	2	4	4	8	0.500	271	281	0.964
4	Belgium	3	0	3	3	2	9	0.222	219	265	0.826

Date	Time		Score		Set 1	Set 2	Set 3	Set 4	Set 5	Total	Report
07 Aug	17:30	Belgium	2–3	Finland	20–25	30–28	20–25	25–22	11–15	106–115	P2 P3
07 Aug	20:00	Germany	1–3	Russia	20–25	25–19	18–25	19–25		82–94	P2 P3
08 Aug	15:00	Finland	1–3	Germany	21–25	25–27	25–23	23–25		94–100	P2 P3
08 Aug	17:30	Russia	3–0	Belgium	25–18	25–22	25–16			75–56	P2 P3
09 Aug	12:30	Belgium	0–3	Germany	17–25	19–25	21–25			57–75	P2 P3
09 Aug	15:00	Finland	0–3	Russia	23–25	17–25	22–25			62–75	P2 P3

=== Pool J ===
- Venue: Palace of Culture and Sports, Varna, Bulgaria
- Dates: August 14–16, 2009
- All times are Eastern European Summer Time (UTC+03:00)

Pos	Team	Pld	W	L	Pts	SW	SL	SR	SPW	SPL	SPR
1	Bulgaria	3	3	0	6	9	1	9.000	249	195	1.277
2	Czech Republic	3	2	1	5	6	6	1.000	249	243	1.025
3	Netherlands	3	1	2	4	5	6	0.833	240	264	0.909
4	Portugal	3	0	3	3	2	9	0.222	216	252	0.857

Date	Time		Score		Set 1	Set 2	Set 3	Set 4	Set 5	Total	Report
14 Aug	17:30	Bulgaria	3–0	Portugal	25–22	25–16	26–24			76–62	P2 P3
14 Aug	20:00	Czech Republic	3–1	Netherlands	23–25	25–13	25–23	25–21		98–82	P2 P3
15 Aug	17:30	Bulgaria	3–0	Czech Republic	25–15	25–22	25–14			75–51	P2 P3
15 Aug	20:00	Portugal	0–3	Netherlands	21–25	23–25	24–26			68–76	P2 P3
16 Aug	17:30	Czech Republic	3–2	Portugal	25–16	22–25	25–12	13–25	15–8	100–86	P2 P3
16 Aug	20:00	Netherlands	1–3	Bulgaria	25–23	16–25	18–25	23–25		82–98	P2 P3

=== Pool K ===
- Venue: Gdynia Sports Arena, Gdynia, Poland
- Dates: August 14–16, 2009
- All times are Central European Summer Time (UTC+02:00)

Pos	Team	Pld	W	L	Pts	SW	SL	SR	SPW	SPL	SPR
1	Poland	3	3	0	6	9	1	9.000	251	192	1.307
2	France	3	2	1	5	6	5	1.200	251	241	1.041
3	Slovakia	3	1	2	4	5	8	0.625	273	304	0.898
4	Slovenia	3	0	3	3	3	9	0.333	243	281	0.865

Date	Time		Score		Set 1	Set 2	Set 3	Set 4	Set 5	Total	Report
14 Aug	17:30	Slovakia	1–3	France	20–25	18–25	25–22	20–25		83–97	P2 P3
14 Aug	20:00	Poland	3–0	Slovenia	25–16	25–23	25–15			75–54	P2 P3
15 Aug	17:30	France	3–1	Slovenia	27–25	25–18	20–25	25–15		97–83	P2 P3
15 Aug	20:00	Poland	3–1	Slovakia	25–19	26–28	25–15	25–19		101–81	P2 P3
16 Aug	14:00	Slovenia	2–3	Slovakia	23–25	25–23	21–25	25–21	12–15	106–109	P2 P3
16 Aug	16:30	Poland	3–0	France	25–17	25–19	25–21			75–57	P2 P3

=== Pool L ===
- Venue: Hala Sportova Jezero, Kragujevac, Serbia
- Dates: August 14–16, 2009
- All times are Central European Summer Time (UTC+02:00)

Pos	Team	Pld	W	L	Pts	SW	SL	SR	SPW	SPL	SPR
1	Serbia	3	3	0	6	9	2	4.500	269	217	1.240
2	Spain	3	2	1	5	7	6	1.167	290	279	1.039
3	Romania	3	1	2	4	6	7	0.857	287	298	0.963
4	Estonia	3	0	3	3	2	9	0.222	227	279	0.814

Date	Time		Score		Set 1	Set 2	Set 3	Set 4	Set 5	Total	Report
14 Aug	18:00	Estonia	1–3	Spain	25–22	21–25	17–25	14–25		77–97	P2 P3
14 Aug	20:30	Serbia	3–1	Romania	25–17	25–15	22–25	25–18		97–75	P2 P3
15 Aug	18:00	Spain	3–2	Romania	25–17	23–25	21–25	27–25	15–13	111–105	P2 P3
15 Aug	20:30	Estonia	0–3	Serbia	15–25	23–25	22–25			60–75	P2 P3
16 Aug	18:00	Romania	3–1	Estonia	26–28	25–13	31–29	25–20		107–90	P2 P3
16 Aug	20:30	Serbia	3–1	Spain	22–25	25–18	25–19	25–20		97–82	P2 P3
