= 2010 FIVB Men's Volleyball World Championship qualification (AVC) =

- Dates: 28 January 2009 – 30 August 2009
- Teams: 23 (from 1 confederation)

The AVC qualification for the 2010 FIVB Men's Volleyball World Championship saw member nations compete for four places at the finals in Italy.

== Draw ==
23 of the 65 AVC national teams entered qualification. (Uzbekistan and Saudi Arabia later withdrew) The teams were distributed according to their position in the FIVB Senior Men's Rankings as of 5 January 2008 using the serpentine system for their distribution. (Rankings shown in brackets) Teams ranked 1–4 did not compete in the first and second rounds, and automatically qualified for the third round. Teams ranked 5–10 did not compete in the first round, and automatically qualified for the second round.

First round

Pool A (Oceania)	Pool B (Central Asia)	Pool C (West Asia)
Tonga (92); Samoa (—); New Zealand (—); Fiji (—)	Maldives (71); Macau (81); Pakistan (104); Bangladesh (—)	Qatar (46); United Arab Emirates (65); ~~Uzbekistan (65)~~; Oman (81); ~~Saudi Arabia (—)~~

Second round

Pool D	Pool E	Pool F
Iran (26); India (43); 1st Pool B 2nd Pool C	Thailand (28); Indonesia (39); 1st Pool C 2nd Pool B	Kazakhstan (32); Chinese Taipei (39); 1st Pool A 3rd Pool C

Third round

Pool G	Pool H
Australia (11); China (21); 1st Pool E 2nd Pool D	Japan (12); South Korea (16); 1st Pool D 1st Pool F

== First round ==
=== Pool A ===
- Venue: Te Rauparaha Arena, Porirua, New Zealand
- Dates: 22–24 April 2009
- All times are New Zealand Standard Time (UTC+12:00)

Pos	Team	Pld	W	L	Pts	SW	SL	SR	SPW	SPL	SPR
1	Tonga	3	2	1	5	7	3	2.333	251	228	1.101
2	New Zealand	3	2	1	5	8	4	2.000	294	268	1.097
3	Samoa	3	2	1	5	6	5	1.200	254	258	0.984
4	Fiji	3	0	3	3	0	9	0.000	182	227	0.802

Date	Time		Score		Set 1	Set 2	Set 3	Set 4	Set 5	Total	Report
22 Apr	15:30	New Zealand	3–0	Fiji	25–21	25–17	25–17			75–55	P2 P3
22 Apr	17:30	Tonga	3–0	Samoa	25–21	27–25	25–17			77–63	P2 P3
23 Apr	15:30	Samoa	3–0	Fiji	26–24	26–24	25–20			77–68	P2 P3
23 Apr	17:30	New Zealand	3–1	Tonga	25–21	22–25	34–32	25–21		106–99	P2 P3
24 Apr	15:30	Tonga	3–0	Fiji	25–15	25–23	25–21			75–59	P2 P3
24 Apr	17:30	New Zealand	2–3	Samoa	25–22	26–24	24–26	24–26	14–16	113–114	P2 P3

=== Pool B ===
- Venue: Liaquat Gymnasium, Islamabad, Pakistan
- Dates: 28–30 January 2009
- All times are Pakistan Standard Time (UTC+05:00)

Pos	Team	Pld	W	L	Pts	SW	SL	SR	SPW	SPL	SPR
1	Pakistan	3	3	0	6	9	0	MAX	225	123	1.829
2	Bangladesh	3	2	1	5	6	4	1.500	221	201	1.100
3	Maldives	3	1	2	4	3	7	0.429	192	233	0.824
4	Macau	3	0	3	3	2	9	0.222	187	268	0.698

Date	Time		Score		Set 1	Set 2	Set 3	Set 4	Set 5	Total	Report
28 Jan	14:00	Maldives	0–3	Bangladesh	13–25	21–25	22–25			56–75	P2 P3
28 Jan	18:00	Pakistan	3–0	Macau	25–11	25–11	25–12			75–34	P2 P3
29 Jan	14:00	Macau	1–3	Maldives	23–25	25–20	16–25	19–25		83–95	P2 P3
29 Jan	17:00	Pakistan	3–0	Bangladesh	25–16	25–19	25–13			75–48	P2 P3
30 Jan	14:00	Macau	1–3	Bangladesh	14–25	25–23	11–25	20–25		70–98	P2 P3
30 Jan	17:00	Pakistan	3–0	Maldives	25–13	25–12	25–16			75–41	P2 P3

=== Pool C ===
- Venue: Sultan Qaboos Sports Complex, Muscat, Oman
- Dates: 2–4 May 2009
- All times are Gulf Standard Time (UTC+04:00)

Pos	Team	Pld	W	L	Pts	SW	SL	SR	SPW	SPL	SPR
1	Qatar	2	2	0	4	6	1	6.000	175	145	1.207
2	Oman	2	1	1	3	4	5	0.800	206	205	1.005
3	United Arab Emirates	2	0	2	2	2	6	0.333	158	189	0.836

Date	Time		Score		Set 1	Set 2	Set 3	Set 4	Set 5	Total	Report
02 May	19:00	Oman	3–2	United Arab Emirates	28–30	25–13	25–21	18–25	18–16	114–105	P2 P3
03 May	19:00	United Arab Emirates	0–3	Qatar	22–25	13–25	18–25			53–75	P2 P3
04 May	19:00	Qatar	3–1	Oman	26–24	25–19	24–26	25–23		100–92	P2 P3

== Second round ==
=== Pool D ===
- Venue: Azadi Volleyball Hall, Tehran, Iran
- Dates: 25–27 May 2009
- All times are Iran Daylight Time (UTC+04:30)

Pos	Team	Pld	W	L	Pts	SW	SL	SR	SPW	SPL	SPR
1	Iran	3	3	0	6	9	1	9.000	249	204	1.221
2	India	3	2	1	5	7	6	1.167	288	283	1.018
3	Pakistan	3	1	2	4	5	8	0.625	278	297	0.936
4	Oman	3	0	3	3	3	9	0.333	258	289	0.893

Date	Time		Score		Set 1	Set 2	Set 3	Set 4	Set 5	Total	Report
25 May	15:00	India	3–2	Pakistan	25–18	24–26	20–25	25–20	15–13	109–102	P2 P3
25 May	17:00	Iran	3–0	Oman	25–16	25–18	28–26			78–60	P2 P3
26 May	15:00	India	3–1	Oman	25–18	20–25	25–23	25–19		95–85	P2 P3
26 May	17:00	Iran	3–0	Pakistan	25–20	25–22	25–18			75–60	P2 P3
27 May	15:00	Iran	3–1	India	21–25	25–19	25–21	25–19		96–84	P2 P3
27 May	17:00	Pakistan	3–2	Oman	25–23	22–25	26–24	28–30	15–11	116–113	P2 P3

=== Pool E ===
- Venue: Nakhon Pathom Sport Center, Nakhon Pathom, Thailand
- Dates: 9–11 June 2009
- All times are Indochina Time (UTC+07:00)

Pos	Team	Pld	W	L	Pts	SW	SL	SR	SPW	SPL	SPR
1	Thailand	3	3	0	6	9	3	3.000	284	248	1.145
2	Indonesia	3	2	1	5	8	4	2.000	283	253	1.119
3	Qatar	3	1	2	4	5	6	0.833	261	255	1.024
4	Bangladesh	3	0	3	3	0	9	0.000	153	225	0.680

Date	Time		Score		Set 1	Set 2	Set 3	Set 4	Set 5	Total	Report
09 Jun	14:00	Qatar	1–3	Indonesia	25–19	28–30	23–25	21–25		97–99	P2 P3
09 Jun	16:00	Thailand	3–0	Bangladesh	25–18	25–19	25–13			75–50	P2 P3
10 Jun	14:00	Bangladesh	0–3	Indonesia	11–25	18–25	13–25			42–75	P2 P3
10 Jun	16:00	Thailand	3–1	Qatar	25–23	25–20	20–25	25–21		95–89	P2 P3
11 Jun	14:00	Qatar	3–0	Bangladesh	25–16	25–23	25–22			75–61	P2 P3
11 Jun	16:00	Indonesia	2–3	Thailand	25–20	22–25	25–27	29–27	8–15	109–114	P2 P3

=== Pool F ===
- Venue: Taipei Gymnasium, Taipei, Taiwan
- Dates: 22–24 May 2009
- All times are Chungyuan Standard Time (UTC+08:00)

Pos	Team	Pld	W	L	Pts	SW	SL	SR	SPW	SPL	SPR
1	Kazakhstan	3	3	0	6	9	0	MAX	230	173	1.329
2	Chinese Taipei	3	2	1	5	6	3	2.000	225	189	1.190
3	United Arab Emirates	3	1	2	4	3	7	0.429	205	237	0.865
4	Tonga	3	0	3	3	1	9	0.111	192	253	0.759

Date	Time		Score		Set 1	Set 2	Set 3	Set 4	Set 5	Total	Report
22 May	15:00	Kazakhstan	3–0	United Arab Emirates	25–22	25–18	25–17			75–57	P2 P3
22 May	18:00	Chinese Taipei	3–0	Tonga	31–29	25–18	25–11			81–58	P2 P3
23 May	15:00	Kazakhstan	3–0	Tonga	25–18	25–12	25–17			75–47	P2 P3
23 May	17:00	Chinese Taipei	3–0	United Arab Emirates	25–17	25–21	25–13			75–51	P2 P3
24 May	15:00	Tonga	1–3	United Arab Emirates	19–25	23–25	25–22	20–25		87–97	P2 P3
24 May	17:00	Chinese Taipei	0–3	Kazakhstan	27–29	18–25	24–26			69–80	P2 P3

== Third round ==
=== Pool G ===
- Venue: Sichuan Provincial Gymnasium, Chengdu, China
- Dates: 14–16 August 2009
- All times are China Standard Time (UTC+08:00)

Pos	Team	Pld	W	L	Pts	SW	SL	SR	SPW	SPL	SPR
1	China	3	3	0	6	9	1	9.000	247	196	1.260
2	Australia	3	2	1	5	7	3	2.333	242	212	1.142
3	India	3	1	2	4	3	6	0.500	179	211	0.848
4	Thailand	3	0	3	3	0	9	0.000	176	225	0.782

Date	Time		Score		Set 1	Set 2	Set 3	Set 4	Set 5	Total	Report
14 Aug	15:30	Australia	3–0	India	25–15	25–22	25–19			75–56	P2 P3
14 Aug	20:00	China	3–0	Thailand	25–15	25–23	25–18			75–56	P2 P3
15 Aug	15:30	Thailand	0–3	Australia	19–25	20–25	20–25			59–75	P2 P3
15 Aug	20:00	China	3–0	India	25–16	25–16	25–16			75–48	P2 P3
16 Aug	15:30	India	3–0	Thailand	25–22	25–20	25–19			75–61	P2 P3
16 Aug	20:00	Australia	1–3	China	22–25	25–17	28–30	17–25		92–97	P2 P3

=== Pool H ===
- Venue: Park Arena, Komaki, Japan
- Dates: 28–30 August 2009
- All times are Japan Standard Time (UTC+09:00)

Pos	Team	Pld	W	L	Pts	SW	SL	SR	SPW	SPL	SPR
1	Japan	3	3	0	6	9	2	4.500	264	224	1.179
2	Iran	3	2	1	5	7	6	1.167	281	271	1.037
3	South Korea	3	1	2	4	5	8	0.625	268	267	1.004
4	Kazakhstan	3	0	3	3	4	9	0.444	245	296	0.828

Date	Time		Score		Set 1	Set 2	Set 3	Set 4	Set 5	Total	Report
28 Aug	15:00	Iran	3–2	South Korea	19–25	25–22	18–25	25–17	15–12	102–101	P2 P3
28 Aug	18:30	Japan	3–1	Kazakhstan	25–20	17–25	25–21	25–16		92–82	P2 P3
29 Aug	11:30	South Korea	3–2	Kazakhstan	23–25	18–25	25–16	25–19	15–5	106–90	P2 P3
29 Aug	14:30	Japan	3–1	Iran	25–17	25–22	22–25	25–17		97–81	P2 P3
30 Aug	11:30	Kazakhstan	1–3	Iran	18–25	14–25	25–23	16–25		73–98	P2 P3
30 Aug	14:30	Japan	3–0	South Korea	25–23	25–16	25–22			75–61	P2 P3
