= 2010 FIVB Men's Volleyball World Championship qualification (NORCECA) =

The NORCECA qualification for the 2010 FIVB Men's Volleyball World Championship saw member nations compete for five places at the finals in Italy.

== Draw ==
33 of the 35 NORCECA national teams entered qualification. The teams were distributed according to their position in the FIVB Senior Men's Rankings as of 5 January 2008 using the serpentine system for their distribution. (Rankings shown in brackets) Teams ranked 1–6 did not compete in the first and second rounds, and automatically qualified for the third round.

First round

| Pool A (ECVA) | Pool B (ECVA) |
|---|---|
| Saint Lucia (65); Saint Vincent and the Grenadines (—); Dominica (81); Grenada (—); Bermuda (—) | Saint Kitts and Nevis (72); Anguilla (92); Antigua and Barbuda (—); Montserrat (—); British Virgin Islands (81) |

Second round

| Pool C (CAZOVA) | Pool D (CAZOVA) | Pool E (AFECAVOL) |
|---|---|---|
| Trinidad and Tobago (38); Suriname (—); Netherlands Antilles (72); Aruba (—); U.S. Virgin Islands (—); 1st Pool B | Mexico (37); Jamaica (65); Cayman Islands (92); Bahamas (—); Haiti (—); 1st Pool A | Costa Rica (61); Panama (54); Guatemala (55); Belize (—); El Salvador (—); Nicaragua (92); Honduras (81) |

Third round

| Pool F | Pool G | Pool H |
|---|---|---|
| United States (3); Dominican Republic (35); 1st Pool E 2nd Pool E | Puerto Rico (8); Barbados (32); 1st Pool D 2nd Pool C | Cuba (17); Canada (18); 1st Pool C 2nd Pool D |

Playoff round

Pool I

2nd Pool E
2nd Pool F
2nd Pool G
Best 3rd

== First round ==
=== Pool A ===
- Venue: Beausejour Indoor Stadium, Gros Islet, Saint Lucia
- Dates: April 15–19, 2009
- All times are Atlantic Standard Time (UTC−04:00)

| Pos | Team | Pld | W | L | Pts | SW | SL | SR | SPW | SPL | SPR |
|---|---|---|---|---|---|---|---|---|---|---|---|
| 1 | Saint Lucia | 4 | 4 | 0 | 8 | 12 | 0 | MAX | 306 | 219 | 1.397 |
| 2 | Dominica | 4 | 3 | 1 | 7 | 9 | 3 | 3.000 | 295 | 248 | 1.190 |
| 3 | Saint Vincent and the Grenadines | 4 | 2 | 2 | 6 | 6 | 7 | 0.857 | 283 | 265 | 1.068 |
| 4 | Bermuda | 4 | 1 | 3 | 5 | 4 | 9 | 0.444 | 241 | 305 | 0.790 |
| 5 | Grenada | 4 | 0 | 4 | 4 | 0 | 12 | 0.000 | 212 | 300 | 0.707 |

| Date | Time | | Score | | Set 1 | Set 2 | Set 3 | Set 4 | Set 5 | Total | Report |
|---|---|---|---|---|---|---|---|---|---|---|---|
| 15 Apr | 19:00 | St. Vincent & the Grenadines | 0–3 | Dominica | 18–25 | 23–25 | 23–25 | | | 64–75 | P2 P3 |
| 15 Apr | 21:00 | Saint Lucia | 3–0 | Grenada | 25–16 | 25–14 | 25–18 | | | 75–48 | P2 P3 |
| 16 Apr | 18:00 | Grenada | 0–3 | St. Vincent & the Grenadines | 16–25 | 20–25 | 17–25 | | | 53–75 | P2 P3 |
| 16 Apr | 20:00 | Dominica | 3–0 | Bermuda | 25–18 | 25–20 | 25–13 | | | 75–51 | P2 P3 |
| 17 Apr | 18:00 | Grenada | 0–3 | Dominica | 12–25 | 21–25 | 19–25 | | | 52–75 | P2 P3 |
| 17 Apr | 20:00 | Saint Lucia | 3–0 | Bermuda | 25–19 | 25–14 | 25–20 | | | 75–53 | P2 P3 |
| 18 Apr | 18:00 | Bermuda | 3–0 | Grenada | 25–21 | 25–17 | 25–21 | | | 75–59 | P2 P3 |
| 18 Apr | 20:00 | St. Vincent & the Grenadines | 0–3 | Saint Lucia | 16–25 | 20–25 | 12–25 | | | 48–75 | P2 P3 |
| 19 Apr | 18:00 | Bermuda | 1–3 | St. Vincent & the Grenadines | 11–25 | 12–25 | 25–21 | 14–25 | | 62–96 | P2 P3 |
| 19 Apr | 20:00 | Saint Lucia | 3–0 | Dominica | 25–22 | 31–29 | 25–19 | | | 81–70 | P2 P3 |

=== Pool B ===
- Venue: YMCA Sports Complex, St. John's, Antigua and Barbuda
- Dates: April 1–5, 2009
- All times are Atlantic Standard Time (UTC−04:00)

| Pos | Team | Pld | W | L | Pts | SW | SL | SR | SPW | SPL | SPR |
|---|---|---|---|---|---|---|---|---|---|---|---|
| 1 | Antigua and Barbuda | 4 | 4 | 0 | 8 | 12 | 3 | 4.000 | 352 | 287 | 1.226 |
| 2 | Saint Kitts and Nevis | 4 | 3 | 1 | 7 | 9 | 5 | 1.800 | 332 | 248 | 1.339 |
| 3 | Anguilla | 4 | 2 | 2 | 6 | 10 | 8 | 1.250 | 377 | 358 | 1.053 |
| 4 | British Virgin Islands | 4 | 1 | 3 | 5 | 6 | 9 | 0.667 | 300 | 318 | 0.943 |
| 5 | Montserrat | 4 | 0 | 4 | 4 | 0 | 12 | 0.000 | 150 | 300 | 0.500 |

| Date | Time | | Score | | Set 1 | Set 2 | Set 3 | Set 4 | Set 5 | Total | Report |
|---|---|---|---|---|---|---|---|---|---|---|---|
| 01 Apr | 21:00 | Anguilla | 3–2 | British Virgin Islands | 25–20 | 25–20 | 23–25 | 21–25 | 15–13 | 109–103 | P2 P3 |
| 01 Apr | 23:00 | Antigua and Barbuda | 3–0 | Montserrat | 25–9 | 25–14 | 25–16 | | | 75–39 | P2 P3 |
| 02 Apr | 19:00 | Saint Kitts and Nevis | 3–2 | Anguilla | 22–25 | 24–26 | 25–10 | 25–17 | 18–16 | 114–94 | P2 P3 |
| 02 Apr | 21:00 | Antigua and Barbuda | 3–1 | British Virgin Islands | 25–23 | 25–13 | 21–25 | 25–20 | | 96–81 | P2 P3 |
| 03 Apr | 19:00 | Saint Kitts and Nevis | 3–0 | Montserrat | 25–5 | 25–13 | 25–20 | | | 75–38 | P2 P3 |
| 03 Apr | 21:00 | Antigua and Barbuda | 3–2 | Anguilla | 24–26 | 25–13 | 17–25 | 25–23 | 15–12 | 106–99 | P2 P3 |
| 04 Apr | 17:00 | Anguilla | 3–0 | Montserrat | 25–11 | 25–13 | 25–11 | | | 75–35 | P2 P3 |
| 04 Apr | 19:00 | Saint Kitts and Nevis | 3–0 | British Virgin Islands | 25–14 | 25–18 | 25–9 | | | 75–41 | P2 P3 |
| 05 Apr | 18:00 | British Virgin Islands | 3–0 | Montserrat | 25–13 | 25–14 | 25–11 | | | 75–38 | P2 P3 |
| 05 Apr | 20:00 | Antigua and Barbuda | 3–0 | Saint Kitts and Nevis | 25–23 | 25–22 | 25–23 | | | 75–68 | P2 P3 |

== Second round ==
=== Pool C ===
- Venue: UWI Sport & Physical Education Centre, Port of Spain, Trinidad and Tobago
- Dates: June 2–6, 2009
- All times are Atlantic Standard Time (UTC−04:00)

==== Preliminary round ====
===== Group A =====
| Pos | Team | Pld | W | L | Pts | SW | SL | SR | SPW | SPL | SPR |
|---|---|---|---|---|---|---|---|---|---|---|---|
| 1 | Trinidad and Tobago | 2 | 2 | 0 | 4 | 6 | 2 | 3.000 | 177 | 141 | 1.255 |
| 2 | U.S. Virgin Islands | 2 | 1 | 1 | 3 | 5 | 4 | 1.250 | 192 | 190 | 1.011 |
| 3 | Aruba | 2 | 0 | 2 | 2 | 1 | 6 | 0.167 | 135 | 173 | 0.780 |

| Date | Time | | Score | | Set 1 | Set 2 | Set 3 | Set 4 | Set 5 | Total | Report |
|---|---|---|---|---|---|---|---|---|---|---|---|
| 02 Jun | 20:00 | Trinidad and Tobago | 3–0 | Aruba | 25–11 | 25–23 | 25–13 | | | 75–47 | P2 P3 |
| 03 Jun | 15:00 | U.S. Virgin Islands | 3–1 | Aruba | 27–25 | 21–25 | 25–20 | 25–18 | | 98–88 | P2 P3 |
| 04 Jun | 18:00 | Trinidad and Tobago | 3–2 | U.S. Virgin Islands | 25–14 | 22–25 | 15–25 | 25–18 | 15–12 | 102–94 | P2 P3 |

===== Group B =====
| Pos | Team | Pld | W | L | Pts | SW | SL | SR | SPW | SPL | SPR |
|---|---|---|---|---|---|---|---|---|---|---|---|
| 1 | Netherlands Antilles | 2 | 2 | 0 | 4 | 6 | 0 | MAX | 151 | 114 | 1.325 |
| 2 | Suriname | 2 | 1 | 1 | 3 | 3 | 3 | 1.000 | 148 | 127 | 1.165 |
| 3 | Antigua and Barbuda | 2 | 0 | 2 | 2 | 0 | 6 | 0.000 | 97 | 155 | 0.626 |

| Date | Time | | Score | | Set 1 | Set 2 | Set 3 | Set 4 | Set 5 | Total | Report |
|---|---|---|---|---|---|---|---|---|---|---|---|
| 02 Jun | 18:00 | Antigua and Barbuda | 0–3 | Netherlands Antilles | 16–25 | 13–25 | 17–25 | | | 46–75 | P2 P3 |
| 03 Jun | 13:00 | Suriname | 0–3 | Netherlands Antilles | 24–26 | 23–25 | 21–25 | | | 68–76 | P2 P3 |
| 04 Jun | 15:00 | Suriname | 3–0 | Antigua and Barbuda | 30–28 | 25–8 | 25–15 | | | 80–51 | P2 P3 |

==== Final round ====
===== Semifinals =====
| Date | Time | | Score | | Set 1 | Set 2 | Set 3 | Set 4 | Set 5 | Total | Report |
|---|---|---|---|---|---|---|---|---|---|---|---|
| 05 Jun | 15:00 | U.S. Virgin Islands | 3–2 | Netherlands Antilles | 25–23 | 23–25 | 16–25 | 26–24 | 17–15 | 107–112 | P2 P3 |
| 05 Jun | 20:00 | Trinidad and Tobago | 1–3 | Suriname | 25–22 | 23–25 | 19–25 | 22–25 | | 89–97 | P2 P3 |

===== 5th place =====
| Date | Time | | Score | | Set 1 | Set 2 | Set 3 | Set 4 | Set 5 | Total | Report |
|---|---|---|---|---|---|---|---|---|---|---|---|
| 06 Jun | 12:00 | Aruba | 3–1 | Antigua and Barbuda | 25–15 | 25–18 | 12–25 | 25–19 | | 87–77 | P2 P3 |

===== 3rd place =====
| Date | Time | | Score | | Set 1 | Set 2 | Set 3 | Set 4 | Set 5 | Total | Report |
|---|---|---|---|---|---|---|---|---|---|---|---|
| 06 Jun | 14:00 | Trinidad and Tobago | 3–0 | Netherlands Antilles | 25–18 | 25–22 | 25–15 | | | 75–55 | P2 P3 |

===== Final =====
| Date | Time | | Score | | Set 1 | Set 2 | Set 3 | Set 4 | Set 5 | Total | Report |
|---|---|---|---|---|---|---|---|---|---|---|---|
| 06 Jun | 18:00 | U.S. Virgin Islands | 1–3 | Suriname | 25–16 | 18–25 | 22–25 | 17–25 | | 82–91 | P2 P3 |

==== Final standing ====
| Rank | Team |
|---|---|
| 1 | Suriname |
| 2 | U.S. Virgin Islands |
| 3 | Trinidad and Tobago |
| 4 | Netherlands Antilles |
| 5 | Aruba |
| 6 | Antigua and Barbuda |

=== Pool D ===
- Venue: National Arena, Kingston, Jamaica
- Dates: May 20–24, 2009
- All times are Eastern Standard Time (UTC−05:00)

==== Preliminary round ====
===== Group A =====
| Pos | Team | Pld | W | L | Pts | SW | SL | SR | SPW | SPL | SPR |
|---|---|---|---|---|---|---|---|---|---|---|---|
| 1 | Jamaica | 2 | 2 | 0 | 4 | 6 | 0 | MAX | 150 | 108 | 1.389 |
| 2 | Haiti | 2 | 1 | 1 | 3 | 3 | 3 | 1.000 | 134 | 125 | 1.072 |
| 3 | Cayman Islands | 2 | 0 | 2 | 2 | 0 | 6 | 0.000 | 99 | 150 | 0.660 |

| Date | Time | | Score | | Set 1 | Set 2 | Set 3 | Set 4 | Set 5 | Total | Report |
|---|---|---|---|---|---|---|---|---|---|---|---|
| 20 May | 21:00 | Jamaica | 3–0 | Haiti | 25–16 | 25–23 | 25–20 | | | 75–59 | P2 P3 |
| 21 May | 17:00 | Cayman Islands | 0–3 | Haiti | 15–25 | 19–25 | 16–25 | | | 50–75 | P2 P3 |
| 22 May | 19:00 | Jamaica | 3–0 | Cayman Islands | 25–11 | 25–20 | 25–18 | | | 75–49 | P2 P3 |

===== Group B =====
| Pos | Team | Pld | W | L | Pts | SW | SL | SR | SPW | SPL | SPR |
|---|---|---|---|---|---|---|---|---|---|---|---|
| 1 | Mexico | 2 | 2 | 0 | 4 | 6 | 0 | MAX | 150 | 99 | 1.515 |
| 2 | Bahamas | 2 | 1 | 1 | 3 | 3 | 5 | 0.600 | 158 | 176 | 0.898 |
| 3 | Saint Lucia | 2 | 0 | 2 | 2 | 2 | 6 | 0.333 | 151 | 184 | 0.821 |

| Date | Time | | Score | | Set 1 | Set 2 | Set 3 | Set 4 | Set 5 | Total | Report |
|---|---|---|---|---|---|---|---|---|---|---|---|
| 20 May | 19:00 | Saint Lucia | 2–3 | Bahamas | 25–22 | 25–22 | 22–25 | 18–25 | 11–15 | 101–109 | P2 P3 |
| 21 May | 19:00 | Bahamas | 0–3 | Mexico | 13–25 | 20–25 | 16–25 | | | 49–75 | P2 P3 |
| 22 May | 17:00 | Mexico | 3–0 | Saint Lucia | 25–18 | 25–15 | 25–17 | | | 75–50 | P2 P3 |

==== Final round ====
===== Semifinals =====
| Date | Time | | Score | | Set 1 | Set 2 | Set 3 | Set 4 | Set 5 | Total | Report |
|---|---|---|---|---|---|---|---|---|---|---|---|
| 23 May | 17:00 | Mexico | 3–0 | Haiti | 25–16 | 25–16 | 25–20 | | | 75–52 | P2 P3 |
| 23 May | 19:00 | Jamaica | 1–3 | Bahamas | 25–19 | 18–25 | 22–25 | 22–25 | | 87–94 | P2 P3 |

===== 5th place =====
| Date | Time | | Score | | Set 1 | Set 2 | Set 3 | Set 4 | Set 5 | Total | Report |
|---|---|---|---|---|---|---|---|---|---|---|---|
| 23 May | 15:00 | Cayman Islands | 0–3 | Saint Lucia | 11–25 | 15–25 | 14–25 | | | 40–75 | P2 P3 |

===== 3rd place =====
| Date | Time | | Score | | Set 1 | Set 2 | Set 3 | Set 4 | Set 5 | Total | Report |
|---|---|---|---|---|---|---|---|---|---|---|---|
| 24 May | 17:00 | Jamaica | 3–1 | Haiti | 25–22 | 25–23 | 22–25 | 25–18 | | 97–88 | P2 P3 |

===== Final =====
| Date | Time | | Score | | Set 1 | Set 2 | Set 3 | Set 4 | Set 5 | Total | Report |
|---|---|---|---|---|---|---|---|---|---|---|---|
| 24 May | 19:00 | Mexico | 3–0 | Bahamas | 25–13 | 25–14 | 25–16 | | | 75–43 | P2 P3 |

==== Final standing ====
| Rank | Team |
|---|---|
| 1 | Mexico |
| 2 | Bahamas |
| 3 | Jamaica |
| 4 | Haiti |
| 5 | Saint Lucia |
| 6 | Cayman Islands |

=== Pool E ===
- Venue: Gimnasio del Polideportivo España, Managua, Nicaragua
- Dates: November 29–December 5, 2008
- All times are Central Standard Time (UTC−06:00)

| Pos | Team | Pld | W | L | Pts | SW | SL | SR | SPW | SPL | SPR |
|---|---|---|---|---|---|---|---|---|---|---|---|
| 1 | Panama | 6 | 5 | 1 | 11 | 17 | 9 | 1.889 | 583 | 536 | 1.088 |
| 2 | Guatemala | 6 | 5 | 1 | 11 | 15 | 9 | 1.667 | 564 | 532 | 1.060 |
| 3 | Costa Rica | 6 | 4 | 2 | 10 | 16 | 7 | 2.286 | 514 | 465 | 1.105 |
| 4 | El Salvador | 6 | 4 | 2 | 10 | 16 | 13 | 1.231 | 639 | 597 | 1.070 |
| 5 | Nicaragua | 6 | 2 | 4 | 8 | 12 | 13 | 0.923 | 546 | 547 | 0.998 |
| 6 | Honduras | 6 | 1 | 5 | 7 | 5 | 15 | 0.333 | 409 | 476 | 0.859 |
| 7 | Belize | 6 | 0 | 6 | 6 | 3 | 18 | 0.167 | 410 | 512 | 0.801 |

| Date | Time | | Score | | Set 1 | Set 2 | Set 3 | Set 4 | Set 5 | Total | Report |
|---|---|---|---|---|---|---|---|---|---|---|---|
| 29 Nov | 14:00 | Guatemala | 3–2 | Panama | 25–18 | 20–25 | 25–23 | 34–36 | 15–9 | 119–111 | P2 P3 |
| 29 Nov | 16:00 | Costa Rica | 3–0 | Belize | 25–15 | 25–22 | 25–17 | | | 75–54 | P2 P3 |
| 29 Nov | 19:00 | El Salvador | 3–2 | Nicaragua | 25–18 | 24–26 | 25–17 | 22–25 | 15–13 | 111–99 | P2 P3 |
| 30 Nov | 15:00 | Belize | 0–3 | Guatemala | 17–25 | 24–26 | 21–25 | | | 62–76 | P2 P3 |
| 30 Nov | 17:00 | Panama | 3–2 | El Salvador | 20–25 | 12–25 | 25–14 | 25–21 | 15–12 | 97–97 | P2 P3 |
| 30 Nov | 19:00 | Honduras | 0–3 | Costa Rica | 23–25 | 13–25 | 15–25 | | | 51–75 | P2 P3 |
| 01 Dec | 15:00 | El Salvador | 3–2 | Belize | 25–15 | 25–20 | 28–30 | 20–25 | 16–14 | 114–104 | P2 P3 |
| 01 Dec | 17:00 | Guatemala | 3–1 | Honduras | 25–27 | 28–26 | 25–15 | 25–17 | | 103–85 | P2 P3 |
| 01 Dec | 19:00 | Nicaragua | 2–3 | Panama | 25–17 | 30–28 | 25–27 | 14–25 | 13–15 | 107–112 | P2 P3 |
| 02 Dec | 15:00 | Honduras | 1–3 | El Salvador | 25–27 | 19–25 | 25–22 | 18–25 | | 87–99 | P2 P3 |
| 02 Dec | 17:00 | Costa Rica | 3–0 | Guatemala | 25–23 | 25–17 | 25–20 | | | 75–60 | P2 P3 |
| 02 Dec | 19:00 | Belize | 1–3 | Nicaragua | 18–25 | 25–19 | 21–25 | 14–25 | | 78–94 | P2 P3 |
| 03 Dec | 15:00 | El Salvador | 3–2 | Costa Rica | 19–25 | 25–22 | 25–17 | 22–25 | 15–13 | 106–102 | P2 P3 |
| 03 Dec | 17:00 | Panama | 3–0 | Belize | 25–16 | 28–26 | 25–21 | | | 78–63 | P2 P3 |
| 03 Dec | 19:00 | Nicaragua | 3–0 | Honduras | 25–21 | 25–15 | 25–14 | | | 75–50 | P2 P3 |
| 04 Dec | 15:00 | Guatemala | 3–2 | El Salvador | 25–22 | 16–25 | 23–25 | 29–27 | 15–13 | 108–112 | P2 P3 |
| 04 Dec | 17:00 | Honduras | 0–3 | Panama | 20–25 | 22–25 | 19–25 | | | 61–75 | P2 P3 |
| 04 Dec | 19:00 | Costa Rica | 3–1 | Nicaragua | 25–17 | 23–25 | 25–20 | 25–22 | | 98–84 | P2 P3 |
| 05 Dec | 15:00 | Belize | 0–3 | Honduras | 22–25 | 12–25 | 15–25 | | | 49–75 | P2 P3 |
| 05 Dec | 17:00 | Panama | 3–2 | Costa Rica | 24–26 | 21–25 | 25–19 | 25–9 | 15–10 | 110–89 | P2 P3 |
| 05 Dec | 19:00 | Nicaragua | 1–3 | Guatemala | 17–25 | 25–20 | 19–25 | 26–28 | | 87–98 | P2 P3 |

== Third round ==
=== Pool F ===
- Venue: Bren Events Center, Irvine, United States
- Dates: August 15–17, 2009
- All times are Pacific Daylight Time (UTC−07:00)

| Pos | Team | Pld | W | L | Pts | SW | SL | SR | SPW | SPL | SPR |
|---|---|---|---|---|---|---|---|---|---|---|---|
| 1 | United States | 3 | 3 | 0 | 6 | 9 | 0 | MAX | 225 | 111 | 2.027 |
| 2 | Dominican Republic | 3 | 2 | 1 | 5 | 6 | 3 | 2.000 | 202 | 199 | 1.015 |
| 3 | Panama | 3 | 1 | 2 | 4 | 3 | 6 | 0.500 | 173 | 202 | 0.856 |
| 4 | Guatemala | 3 | 0 | 3 | 3 | 0 | 9 | 0.000 | 139 | 227 | 0.612 |

| Date | Time | | Score | | Set 1 | Set 2 | Set 3 | Set 4 | Set 5 | Total | Report |
|---|---|---|---|---|---|---|---|---|---|---|---|
| 15 Aug | 17:00 | Dominican Republic | 3–0 | Panama | 25–19 | 25–20 | 25–22 | | | 75–61 | P2 P3 |
| 15 Aug | 19:30 | United States | 3–0 | Guatemala | 25–8 | 25–10 | 25–6 | | | 75–24 | P2 P3 |
| 16 Aug | 17:00 | Guatemala | 0–3 | Dominican Republic | 17–25 | 21–25 | 25–27 | | | 63–77 | P2 P3 |
| 16 Aug | 19:30 | Panama | 0–3 | United States | 12–25 | 14–25 | 11–25 | | | 37–75 | P2 P3 |
| 17 Aug | 17:00 | Guatemala | 0–3 | Panama | 22–25 | 19–25 | 11–25 | | | 52–75 | P2 P3 |
| 17 Aug | 19:30 | Dominican Republic | 0–3 | United States | 16–25 | 19–25 | 15–25 | | | 50–75 | P2 P3 |

=== Pool G ===
- Venue: Coliseo Héctor Solá Bezares, Caguas, Puerto Rico
- Dates: July 8–10, 2009
- All times are Atlantic Standard Time (UTC−04:00)

| Pos | Team | Pld | W | L | Pts | SW | SL | SR | SPW | SPL | SPR |
|---|---|---|---|---|---|---|---|---|---|---|---|
| 1 | Puerto Rico | 3 | 3 | 0 | 6 | 9 | 2 | 4.500 | 262 | 164 | 1.598 |
| 2 | Mexico | 3 | 2 | 1 | 5 | 8 | 3 | 2.667 | 240 | 216 | 1.111 |
| 3 | Barbados | 3 | 1 | 2 | 4 | 3 | 6 | 0.500 | 159 | 212 | 0.750 |
| 4 | U.S. Virgin Islands | 3 | 0 | 3 | 3 | 0 | 9 | 0.000 | 156 | 225 | 0.693 |

| Date | Time | | Score | | Set 1 | Set 2 | Set 3 | Set 4 | Set 5 | Total | Report |
|---|---|---|---|---|---|---|---|---|---|---|---|
| 08 Jul | 16:00 | Barbados | 0–3 | Mexico | 21–25 | 15–25 | 15–25 | | | 51–75 | P2 P3 |
| 08 Jul | 20:00 | Puerto Rico | 3–0 | U.S. Virgin Islands | 25–12 | 25–16 | 25–13 | | | 75–41 | P2 P3 |
| 09 Jul | 14:00 | U.S. Virgin Islands | 0–3 | Mexico | 19–25 | 19–25 | 15–25 | | | 53–75 | P2 P3 |
| 09 Jul | 18:00 | Barbados | 0–3 | Puerto Rico | 11–25 | 11–25 | 11–25 | | | 33–75 | P2 P3 |
| 10 Jul | 18:00 | U.S. Virgin Islands | 0–3 | Barbados | 21–25 | 21–25 | 20–25 | | | 62–75 | P2 P3 |
| 10 Jul | 20:00 | Puerto Rico | 3–2 | Mexico | 25–13 | 23–25 | 25–18 | 24–26 | 15–8 | 112–90 | P2 P3 |

=== Pool H ===
- Venue: Coliseo de la Ciudad Deportiva, Havana, Cuba
- Dates: August 14–16, 2009
- All times are Cuba Daylight Time (UTC−04:00)

| Pos | Team | Pld | W | L | Pts | SW | SL | SR | SPW | SPL | SPR |
|---|---|---|---|---|---|---|---|---|---|---|---|
| 1 | Cuba | 3 | 3 | 0 | 6 | 9 | 0 | MAX | 226 | 135 | 1.674 |
| 2 | Canada | 3 | 2 | 1 | 5 | 6 | 3 | 2.000 | 214 | 168 | 1.274 |
| 3 | Bahamas | 3 | 1 | 2 | 4 | 3 | 8 | 0.375 | 188 | 243 | 0.774 |
| 4 | Suriname | 3 | 0 | 3 | 3 | 2 | 9 | 0.222 | 171 | 253 | 0.676 |

| Date | Time | | Score | | Set 1 | Set 2 | Set 3 | Set 4 | Set 5 | Total | Report |
|---|---|---|---|---|---|---|---|---|---|---|---|
| 14 Aug | 15:00 | Canada | 3–0 | Bahamas | 25–14 | 25–15 | 25–20 | | | 75–49 | P2 P3 |
| 14 Aug | 17:00 | Cuba | 3–0 | Suriname | 25–13 | 25–10 | 25–12 | | | 75–35 | P2 P3 |
| 15 Aug | 15:00 | Suriname | 0–3 | Canada | 13–25 | 17–25 | 13–25 | | | 43–75 | P2 P3 |
| 15 Aug | 17:00 | Bahamas | 0–3 | Cuba | 14–25 | 9–25 | 13–25 | | | 36–75 | P2 P3 |
| 16 Aug | 15:00 | Suriname | 2–3 | Bahamas | 17–25 | 18–25 | 25–21 | 25–17 | 8–15 | 93–103 | P2 P3 |
| 16 Aug | 17:00 | Cuba | 3–0 | Canada | 25–21 | 25–19 | 26–24 | | | 76–64 | P2 P3 |

=== Third placed teams ===
| Pos | Team | Pld | W | L | Pts | SW | SL | SR | SPW | SPL | SPR |
|---|---|---|---|---|---|---|---|---|---|---|---|
| 1 | Panama | 3 | 1 | 2 | 4 | 3 | 6 | 0.500 | 173 | 202 | 0.856 |
| 2 | Bahamas | 3 | 1 | 2 | 4 | 3 | 8 | 0.375 | 188 | 243 | 0.774 |
| 3 | Barbados | 3 | 1 | 2 | 4 | 3 | 6 | 0.500 | 159 | 212 | 0.750 |

== Playoff round ==
=== Pool I ===
- Venue: Complejo Panamericano de Voleibol, Guadalajara, Mexico
- Dates: August 28–30, 2009
- All times are Central Daylight Time (UTC−05:00)

| Pos | Team | Pld | W | L | Pts | SW | SL | SR | SPW | SPL | SPR |
|---|---|---|---|---|---|---|---|---|---|---|---|
| 1 | Canada | 3 | 3 | 0 | 6 | 9 | 0 | MAX | 225 | 151 | 1.490 |
| 2 | Mexico | 3 | 2 | 1 | 5 | 6 | 5 | 1.200 | 234 | 224 | 1.045 |
| 3 | Dominican Republic | 3 | 1 | 2 | 4 | 5 | 6 | 0.833 | 231 | 234 | 0.987 |
| 4 | Panama | 3 | 0 | 3 | 3 | 0 | 9 | 0.000 | 144 | 225 | 0.640 |

| Date | Time | | Score | | Set 1 | Set 2 | Set 3 | Set 4 | Set 5 | Total | Report |
|---|---|---|---|---|---|---|---|---|---|---|---|
| 28 Aug | 17:00 | Dominican Republic | 0–3 | Canada | 18–25 | 19–25 | 22–25 | | | 59–75 | P2 P3 |
| 28 Aug | 20:00 | Mexico | 3–0 | Panama | 25–13 | 25–21 | 25–18 | | | 75–52 | P2 P3 |
| 29 Aug | 17:00 | Canada | 3–0 | Panama | 25–18 | 25–10 | 25–14 | | | 75–42 | P2 P3 |
| 29 Aug | 19:00 | Mexico | 3–2 | Dominican Republic | 22–25 | 22–25 | 25–17 | 25–18 | 15–12 | 109–97 | P2 P3 |
| 30 Aug | 15:00 | Panama | 0–3 | Dominican Republic | 14–25 | 16–25 | 20–25 | | | 50–75 | P2 P3 |
| 30 Aug | 17:00 | Mexico | 0–3 | Canada | 15–25 | 18–25 | 17–25 | | | 50–75 | P2 P3 |
