= 2010 FIVB Men's Volleyball World Championship qualification (CAVB) =

The CAVB qualification for the 2010 FIVB Men's Volleyball World Championship saw member nations compete for three places at the finals in Italy.

== Draw ==
14 of the 53 CAVB national teams entered qualification. (DR Congo later withdrew) The teams were distributed according to their position in the FIVB Senior Men's Rankings as of 5 January 2008 using the serpentine system for their distribution. (Rankings shown in brackets) Teams ranked 1–6 did not compete in the second round, and automatically qualified for the third round.

Second round

Pool A (North)	Pool B (South)
Algeria (60); Morocco (65); Nigeria (—); ~~DR Congo (—)~~	Mozambique (80); Mauritius (81); Zimbabwe (102); Malawi (—)

Third round

Pool C	Pool D	Pool E
Egypt (14); Botswana (51); 2nd Pool A 3rd Pool A	Tunisia (15); Kenya (35); 1st Pool A 3rd Pool C	Cameroon (23); South Africa (25); 1st Pool B 2nd Pool B

== Second round ==
=== Pool A ===
- Venue: Salle Omnisport Mohamed Nasri, Chlef, Algeria
- Dates: 26–28 May 2009
- All times are Central European Time (UTC+01:00)

Pos	Team	Pld	W	L	Pts	SW	SL	SR	SPW	SPL	SPR
1	Algeria	2	2	0	4	6	1	6.000	170	142	1.197
2	Morocco	2	1	1	3	4	3	1.333	157	146	1.075
3	Nigeria	2	0	2	2	0	6	0.000	114	153	0.745

Date	Time		Score		Set 1	Set 2	Set 3	Set 4	Set 5	Total	Report
26 May	17:30	Morocco	3–0	Nigeria	25–16	25–20	25–18			75–54	P2 P3
27 May	17:30	Algeria	3–1	Morocco	25–18	17–25	25–20	25–19		92–82	P2 P3
28 May	16:00	Nigeria	0–3	Algeria	13–25	21–25	26–28			60–78	P2 P3

=== Pool B ===
- Venue: Maxaquene, Maputo, Mozambique
- Dates: 1–3 May 2009
- All times are Central Africa Time (UTC+02:00)

Pos	Team	Pld	W	L	Pts	SW	SL	SR	SPW	SPL	SPR
1	Mauritius	3	3	0	6	9	1	9.000	248	169	1.467
2	Zimbabwe	3	2	1	5	7	3	2.333	244	200	1.220
3	Mozambique	3	1	2	4	3	7	0.429	207	217	0.954
4	Malawi	3	0	3	3	1	9	0.111	135	248	0.544

Date	Time		Score		Set 1	Set 2	Set 3	Set 4	Set 5	Total	Report
01 May	14:00	Mauritius	3–1	Zimbabwe	23–25	25–21	25–21	25–21		98–88	P2 P3
01 May	16:00	Mozambique	3–1	Malawi	23–25	25–10	25–10	25–16		98–61	P2 P3
02 May	14:00	Malawi	0–3	Zimbabwe	9–25	14–25	13–25			36–75	P2 P3
02 May	16:00	Mozambique	0–3	Mauritius	11–25	16–25	16–25			43–75	P2 P3
03 May	14:00	Mauritius	3–0	Malawi	25–13	25–15	25–10			75–38	P2 P3
03 May	16:00	Zimbabwe	3–0	Mozambique	25–18	25–19	31–29			81–66	P2 P3

== Third round ==
=== Pool C ===
- Venue: Cairo Stadium Indoor Halls Complex, Cairo, Egypt
- Dates: 18–20 August 2009
- All times are Eastern European Summer Time (UTC+03:00)

Pos	Team	Pld	W	L	Pts	SW	SL	SR	SPW	SPL	SPR
1	Egypt	3	3	0	6	9	0	MAX	225	140	1.607
2	Nigeria	3	2	1	5	6	5	1.200	225	231	0.974
3	Morocco	3	1	2	4	5	8	0.625	260	271	0.959
4	Botswana	3	0	3	3	2	9	0.222	190	258	0.736

Date	Time		Score		Set 1	Set 2	Set 3	Set 4	Set 5	Total	Report
18 Aug	18:00	Morocco	2–3	Nigeria	25–15	25–23	22–25	21–25	13–15	106–103	P2 P3
18 Aug	21:00	Egypt	3–0	Botswana	25–16	25–21	25–10			75–47	P2 P3
19 Aug	18:00	Botswana	0–3	Nigeria	18–25	16–25	16–25			50–75	P2 P3
19 Aug	20:00	Egypt	3–0	Morocco	25–16	25–14	25–16			75–46	P2 P3
20 Aug	18:00	Morocco	3–2	Botswana	25–20	21–25	25–17	22–25	15–6	108–93	P2 P3
20 Aug	20:00	Egypt	3–0	Nigeria	25–17	25–14	25–16			75–47	P2 P3

=== Pool D ===
- Venue: El Menzah Sports Palace, Tunis, Tunisia
- Dates: 14–16 August 2009
- All times are Central European Time (UTC+01:00)

Pos	Team	Pld	W	L	Pts	SW	SL	SR	SPW	SPL	SPR
1	Tunisia	3	3	0	6	9	3	3.000	274	232	1.181
2	Algeria	3	2	1	5	7	3	2.333	241	195	1.236
3	Kenya	3	1	2	4	5	6	0.833	231	227	1.018
4	Mozambique	3	0	3	3	0	9	0.000	133	225	0.591

Date	Time		Score		Set 1	Set 2	Set 3	Set 4	Set 5	Total	Report
14 Aug	16:00	Algeria	3–0	Kenya	25–14	25–18	25–21			75–53	P2 P3
14 Aug	18:00	Tunisia	3–0	Mozambique	25–10	25–13	25–15			75–38	P2 P3
15 Aug	16:00	Mozambique	0–3	Algeria	11–25	15–25	19–25			45–75	P2 P3
15 Aug	18:00	Kenya	2–3	Tunisia	25–18	25–19	23–25	17–25	13–15	103–102	P2 P3
16 Aug	16:00	Mozambique	0–3	Kenya	22–25	13–25	15–25			50–75	P2 P3
16 Aug	19:00	Tunisia	3–1	Algeria	25–19	27–25	20–25	25–22		97–91	P2 P3

=== Pool E ===
- Venue: Palais des Sports de Warda, Yaoundé, Cameroon
- Dates: 21–23 August 2009
- All times are West Africa Time (UTC+01:00)

Pos	Team	Pld	W	L	Pts	SW	SL	SR	SPW	SPL	SPR
1	Cameroon	3	3	0	6	9	0	MAX	225	169	1.331
2	South Africa	3	2	1	5	6	5	1.200	245	217	1.129
3	Mauritius	3	1	2	4	5	7	0.714	255	275	0.927
4	Zimbabwe	3	0	3	3	1	9	0.111	188	252	0.746

Date	Time		Score		Set 1	Set 2	Set 3	Set 4	Set 5	Total	Report
21 Aug	15:00	Mauritius	2–3	South Africa	17–25	18–25	25–22	25–19	5–15	90–106	P2 P3
21 Aug	17:00	Cameroon	3–0	Zimbabwe	25–21	25–11	25–10			75–42	P2 P3
22 Aug	14:30	South Africa	3–0	Zimbabwe	25–15	25–23	25–14			75–52	P2 P3
22 Aug	17:00	Mauritius	0–3	Cameroon	22–25	20–25	21–25			63–75	P2 P3
23 Aug	14:30	Zimbabwe	1–3	Mauritius	27–25	21–25	21–25	25–27		94–102	P2 P3
23 Aug	15:00	Cameroon	3–0	South Africa	25–21	25–22	25–21			75–64	P2 P3
