= 2010 FIVB Men's Volleyball World Championship =

2010 FIVB World Championship

Tournament details
- Host country: Italy
- Dates: 25 September – 10 October
- Teams: 24 (from 5 confederations)
- Venue: 10 (in 10 host cities)
- Officially opened by: Giorgio Napolitano

Final positions
- Champions: Brazil (3rd title)
- Runners-up: Cuba
- Third place: Serbia
- Fourth place: Italy

Tournament awards
- MVP: (Brazil) Murilo Endres

Tournament statistics
- Matches played: 78
- Attendance: 339,324 (4,350 per match)

The 2010 FIVB Men's Volleyball World Championship was held in Italy from 25 September to 10 October 2010. The tournament featured 24 teams to determine the world champions in men's volleyball. In addition to 2006 champion Brazil and host nation Italy, 22 teams qualified for the tournament by means of continental and regional competitions. The matches took place in ten venues across ten Italian cities, with the final being held at the PalaLottomatica, Rome.

The tournament was won by Brazil, who beat Cuba in final. Brazil won their third straight world championship having won previously in 2002 and 2006. The podium was completed by Serbia who defeated Italy in the 3rd place match. Brazilian wing-spiker Murilo Endres was named the tournament MVP.

Brazil's victory continued their eight-year period of domination of world volleyball. Brazil has now won 15 of 17 major competitions since 2002. Brazil's third straight world championship equals the record for consecutive titles set by Italy in the 1990s.

== Hosting ==
The tournament was held in ten cities across Italy.

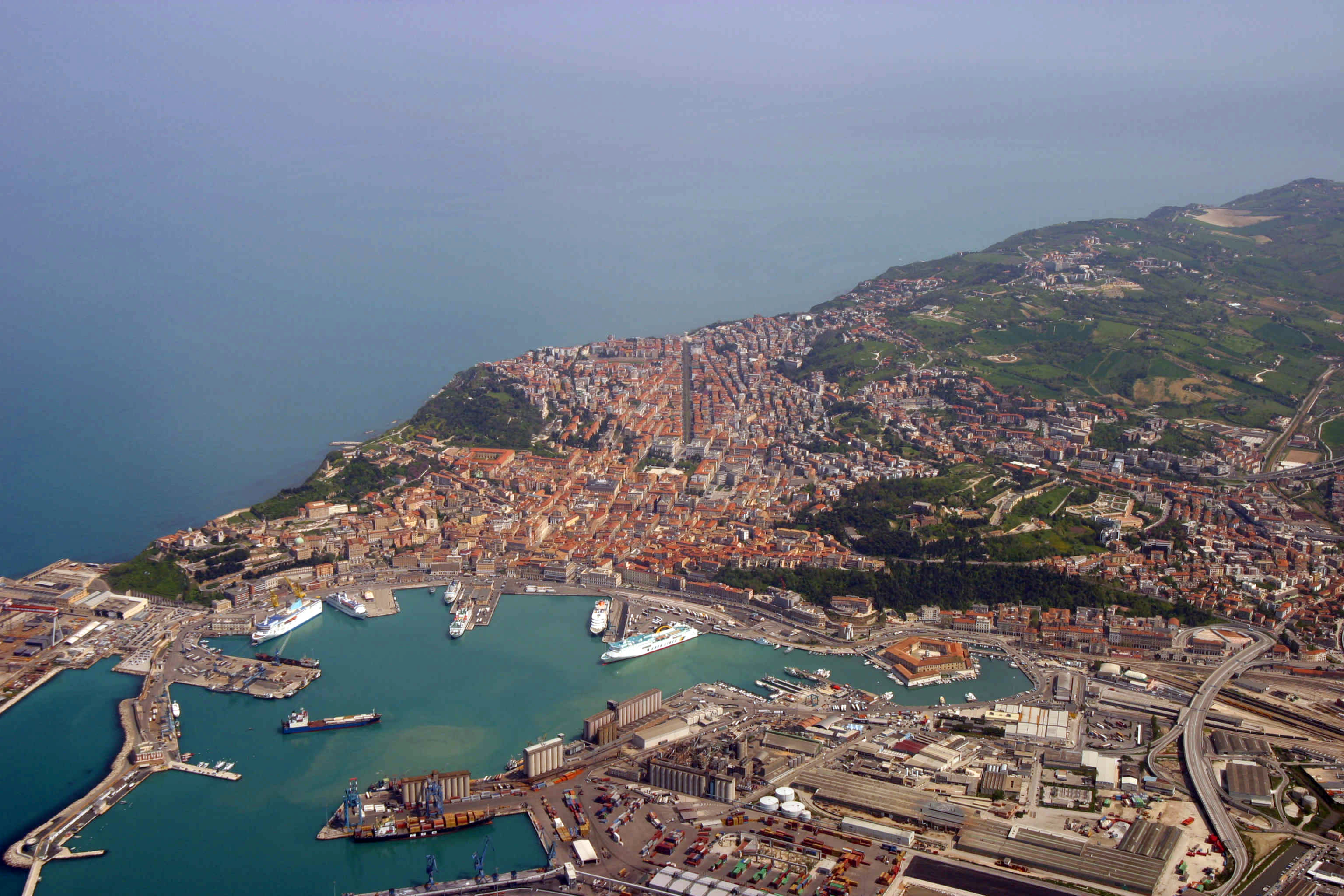
Ancona

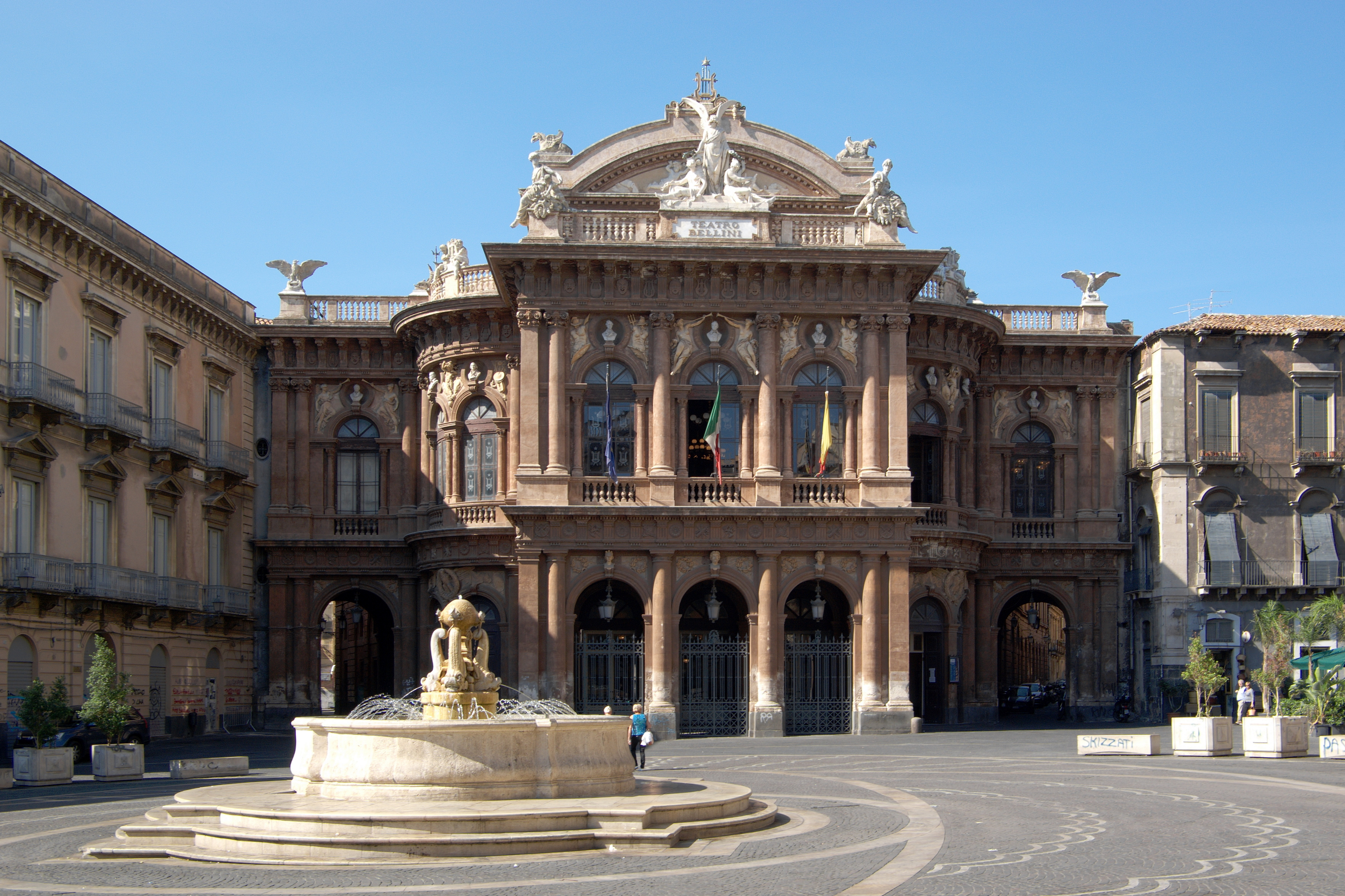
Catania

Florence

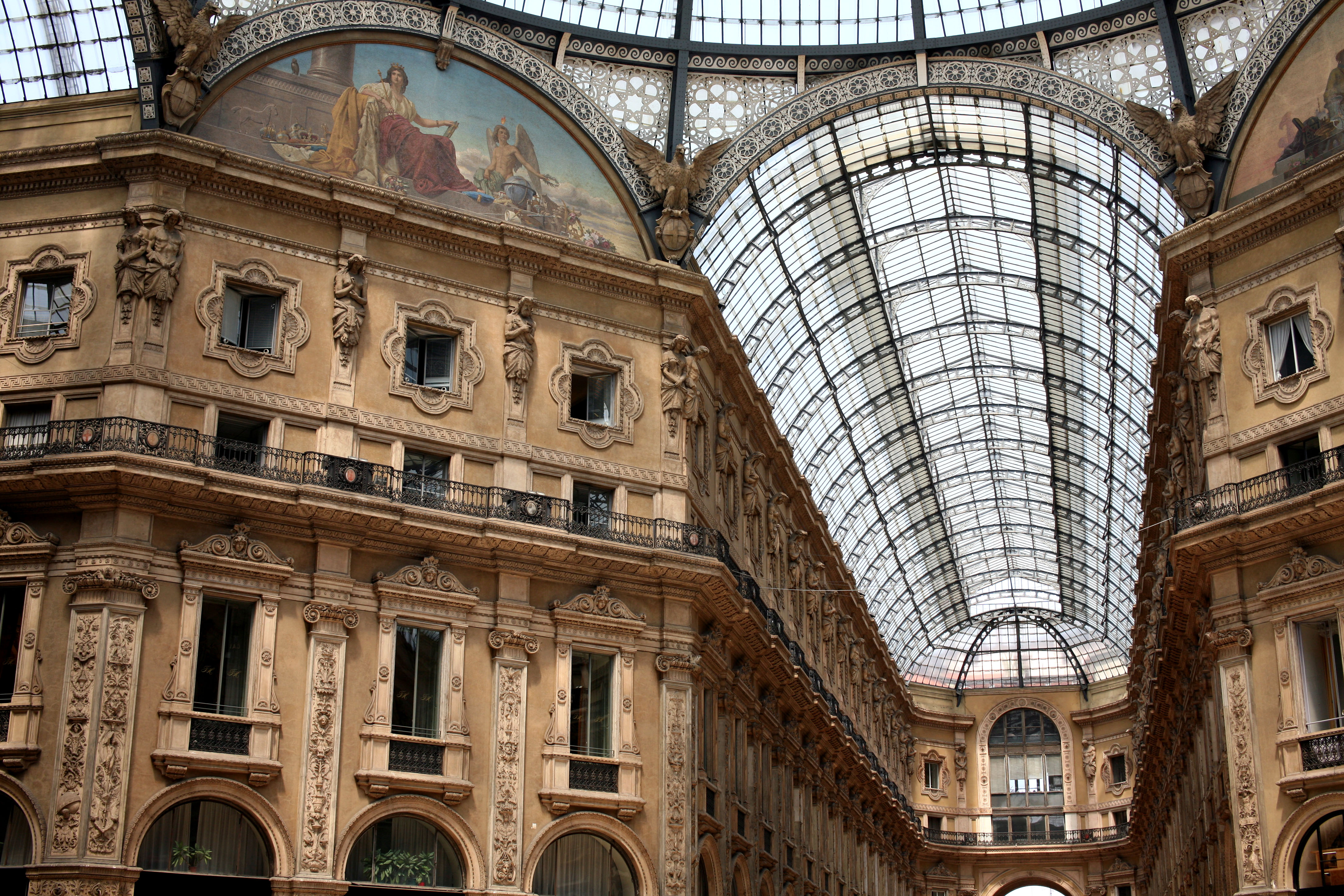
Milan

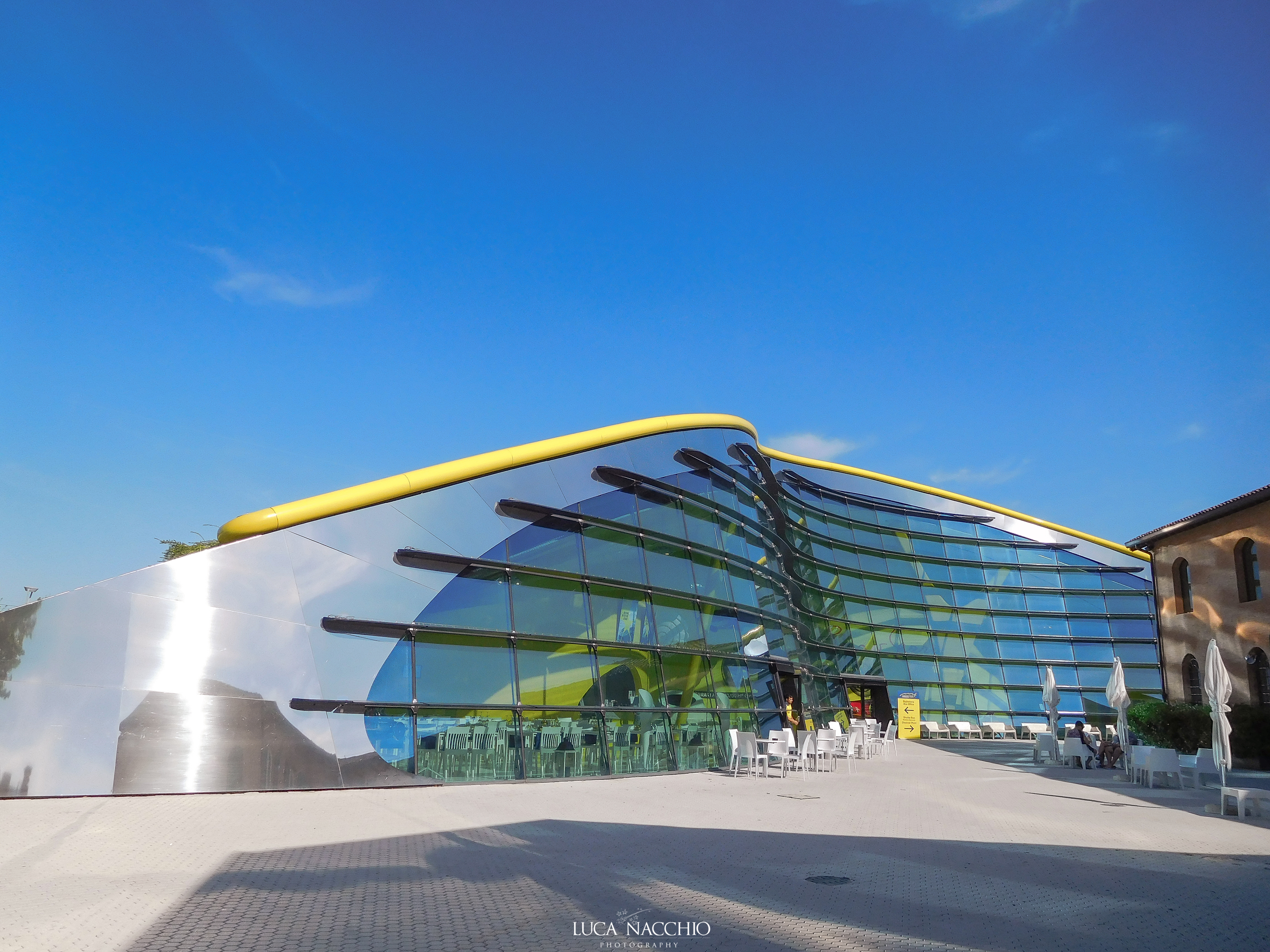
Modena

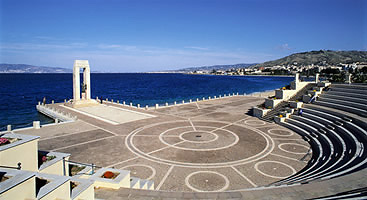
Reggio Calabria

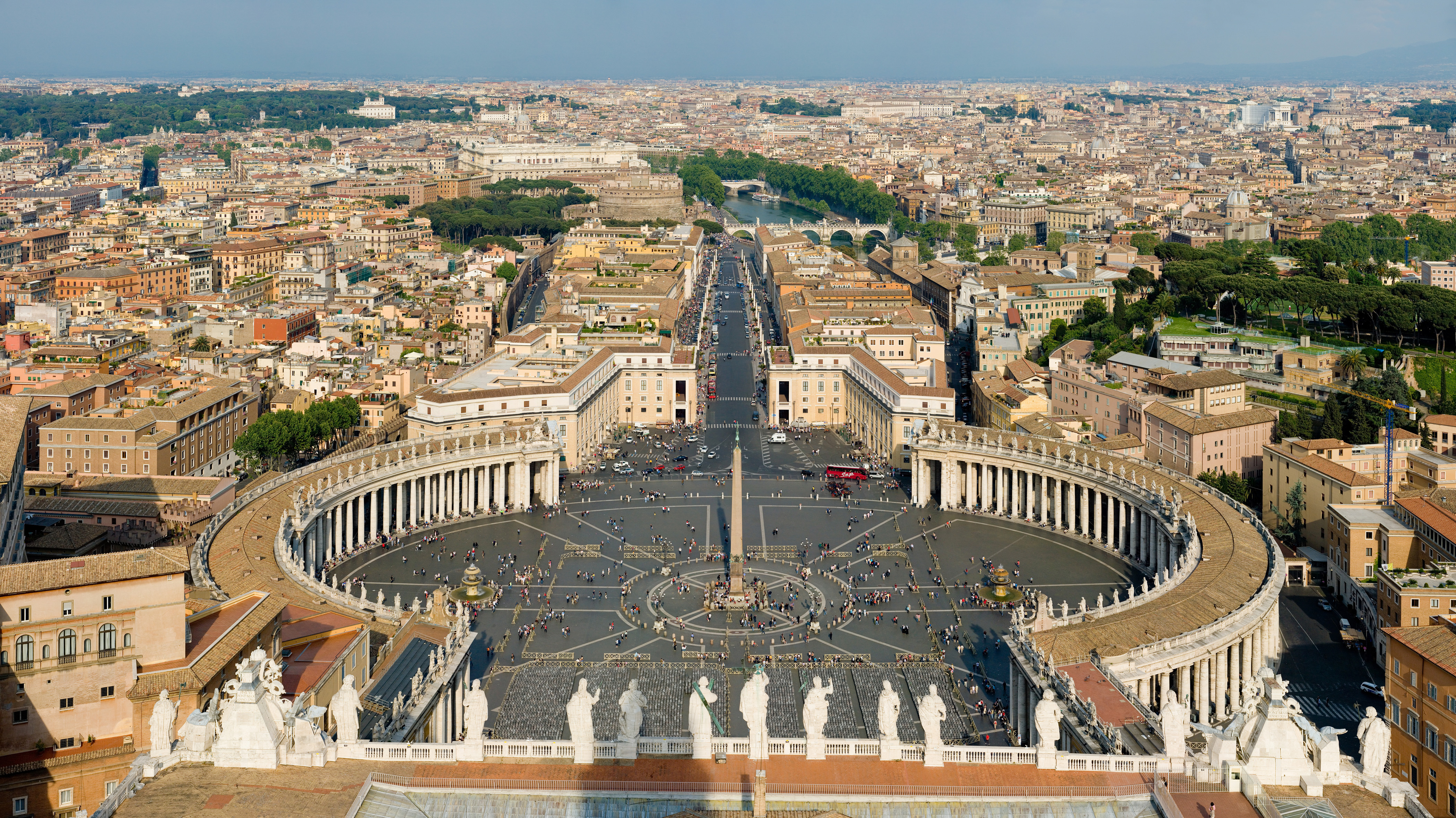
Rome

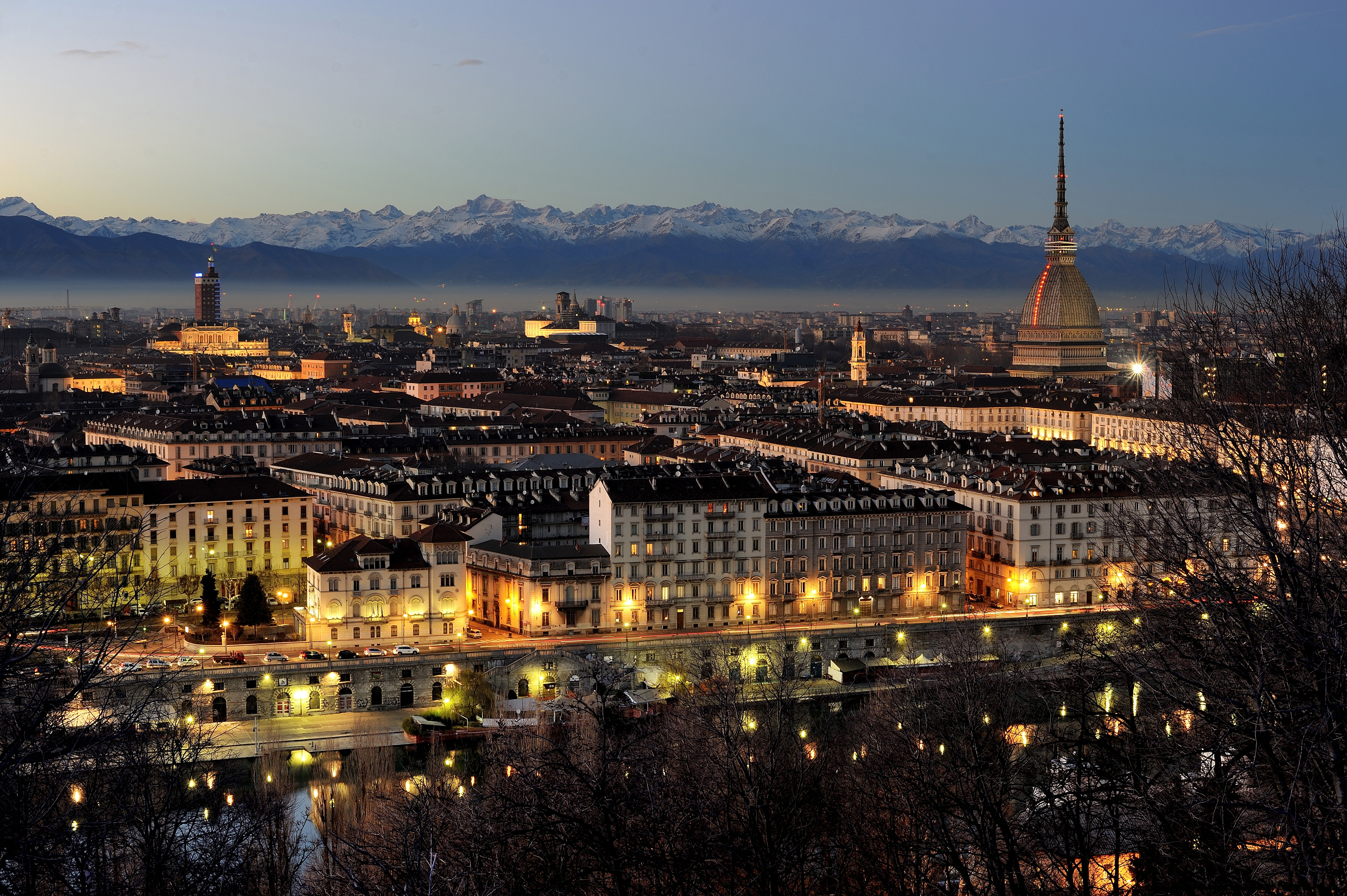
Turin

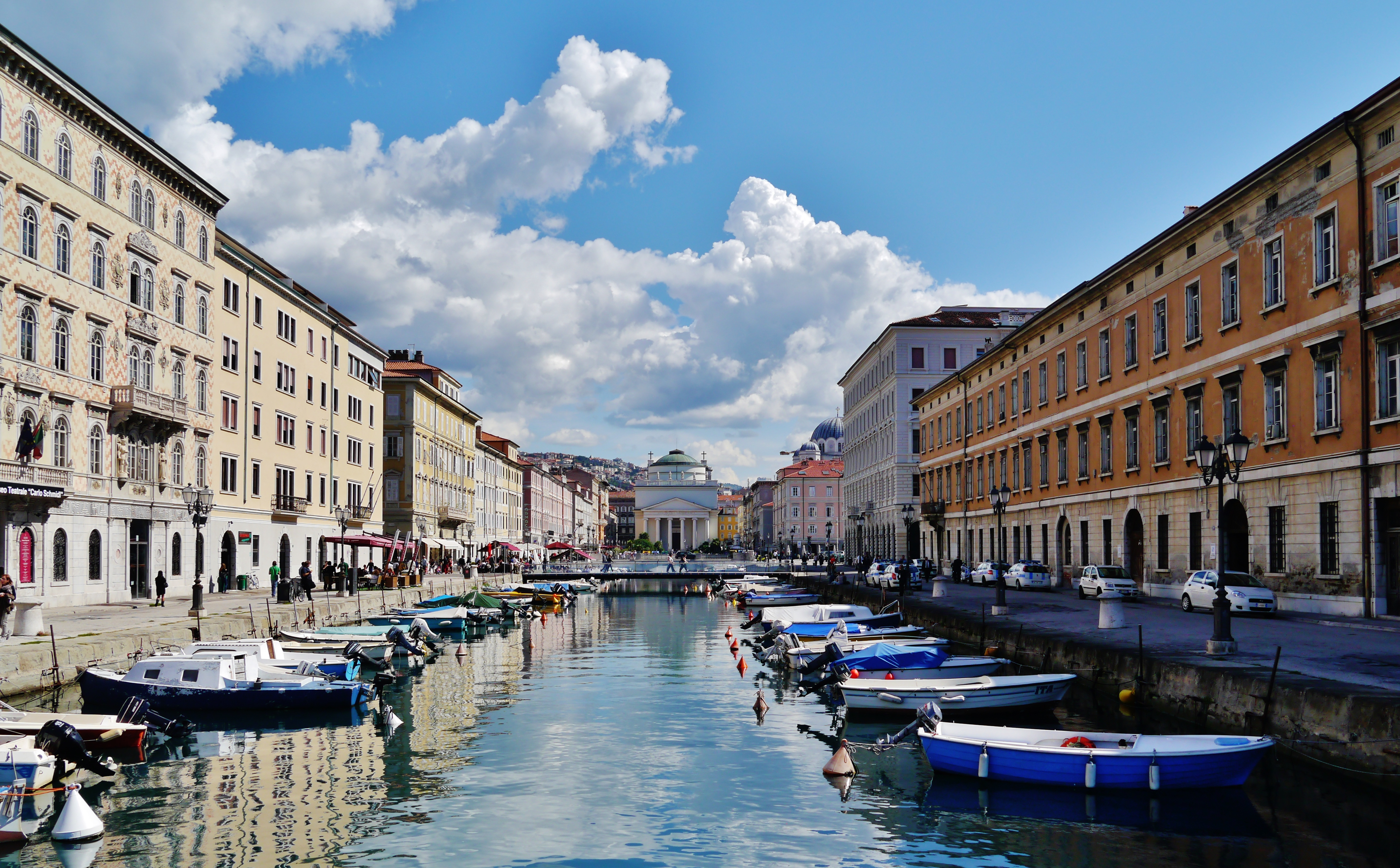
Trieste

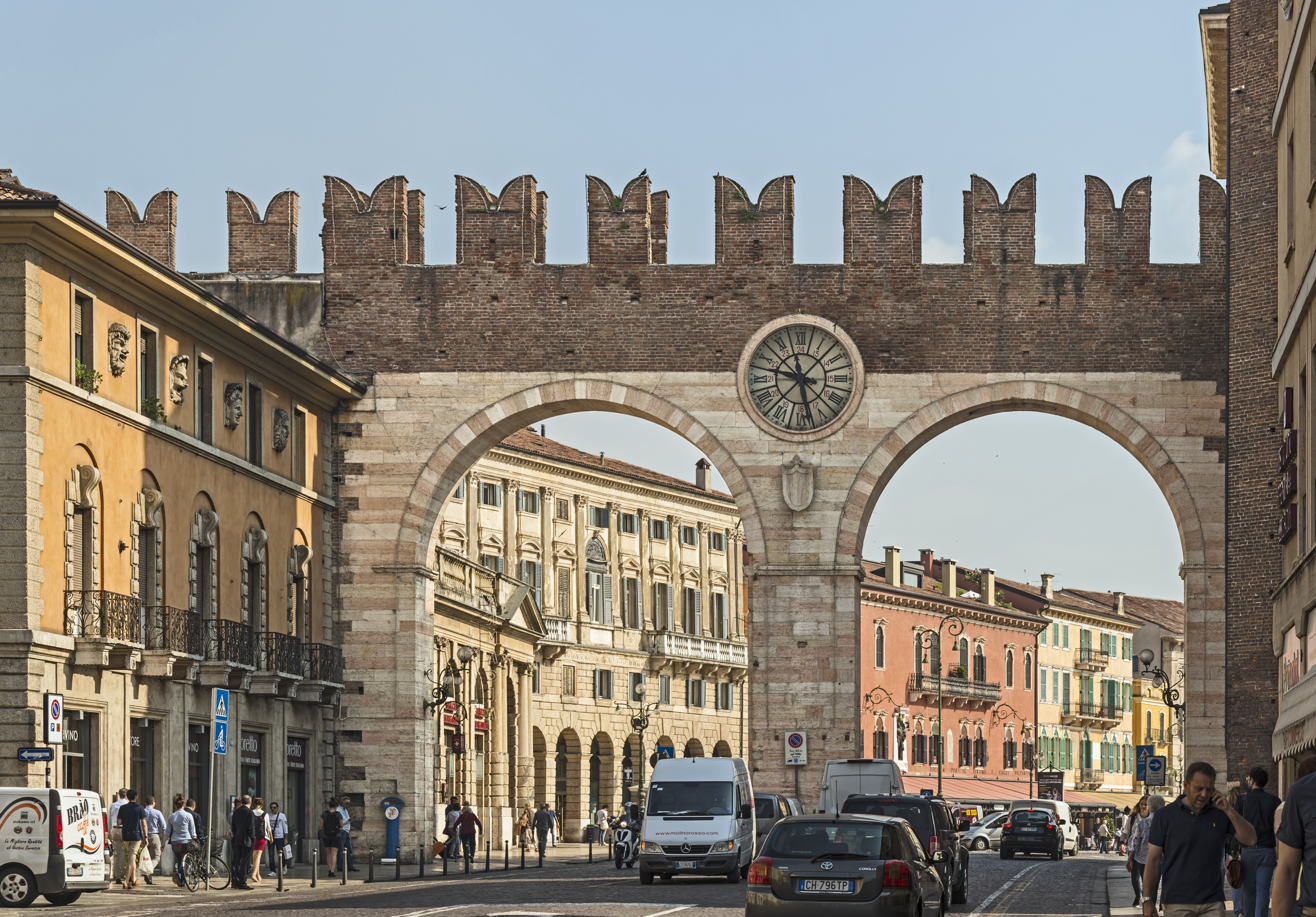
Verona

== Qualification ==
The regional qualification stage determined the 24 teams that would compete in the championship competition. Two spots were guaranteed to the host country Italy and 2006 champions Brazil. Regional governing bodies were allocated the remaining 22 spots. Africa was granted three, Asia and Oceania four, Europe eight, North America five and South America two places. Qualification competitions took place ranging from January to August 2009.

Africa (CAVB)	Asia and Oceania (AVC)	Europe (CEV)	North America (NORCECA)	South America (CSV)
Pool C Winners: Egypt; Pool D Winners: Tunisia; Pool E Winners: Cameroon	Pool G Winners: China; Pool G Runners-up: Australia; Pool H Winners: Japan; Pool H Runners-up: Iran	Host Country: Italy; Pool I Winners: Russia; Pool I Runners-up: Germany; Pool J Winners: Bulgaria; Pool J Runners-up: Czech Republic; Pool K Winners: Poland; Pool K Runners-up: France; Pool L Winners: Serbia; Pool L Runners-up: Spain	Pool F Winners: United States; Pool G Winners: Puerto Rico; Pool H Winners: Cuba; Pool I Winners: Canada; Pool I Runners-up: Mexico	Defending Champions: Brazil; Pool A Winners: Argentina; Pool B Winners: Venezuela

== Pools composition ==
=== First round ===
Teams map

Teams were seeded in the first two positions of each pool following the serpentine system according to their FIVB World Ranking as of 28 July 2009. FIVB reserved the right to seed the hosts as head of pool A regardless of the World Ranking. All teams not seeded were drawn to take other available positions in the remaining lines, following the World Ranking. The draw was held in Rome, Italy on 28 October 2009. Rankings are shown in brackets except the hosts who ranked 6th.

Pool A	Pool B	Pool C	Pool D	Pool E	Pool F
Italy (Hosts)	Brazil (1)	Russia (2)	United States (3)	Bulgaria (4)	Serbia (5)
Japan (12)	Spain (11)	Puerto Rico (10)	Argentina (9)	China (8)	Poland (7)
Egypt (18)	Cuba (13)	Australia (15)	Venezuela (15)	France (17)	Germany (14)
Iran (24)	Tunisia (20)	Cameroon (23)	Mexico (35)	Czech Republic (27)	Canada (21)

=== Second round ===
Pool G		Pool H		Pool I		Pool L		Pool M		Pool N	
1A	Italy	1B	Cuba	1C	Russia	1D	United States	1E	France	1F	Poland
2C	Puerto Rico	2F	Serbia	2A	Egypt	2E	Czech Republic	2D	Argentina	2B	Brazil
3F	Germany	3D	Mexico	3B	Spain	3C	Cameroon	3A	Japan	3E	Bulgaria

=== Third round ===
Pool O		Pool P		Pool Q		Pool R	
1G	Italy	1H	Serbia	1I	Spain	1L	Czech Republic
2L	United States	1M	Argentina	1N	Bulgaria	2G	Germany
2M	France	2I	Russia	2H	Cuba	2N	Brazil

== Venues ==
Pool A, H and M	Pool B	Pool C and 5th–8th places	Pool D
Assago, Italy	Verona, Italy	Modena, Italy	Reggio Calabria, Italy
Mediolanum Forum	PalaOlimpia	PalaPanini	PalaCalafiore
Capacity: 11,500	Capacity: 6,200	Capacity: 5,100	Capacity: 7,200
Pool E	2010 FIVB Men's Volleyball World Championship is located in Italy		Pool F
Turin, Italy	2010 FIVB Men's Volleyball World Championship is located in Italy		Trieste, Italy
PalaRuffini	2010 FIVB Men's Volleyball World Championship is located in Italy		PalaTrieste
Capacity: 5,000	2010 FIVB Men's Volleyball World Championship is located in Italy		Capacity: 6,972
Pool G and I	Pool L and N	Pool O, R and Final four	Pool P, Q and 9th–12th places
Catania, Italy	Ancona, Italy	Rome, Italy	Florence, Italy
PalaCatania	PalaRossini	PalaLottomatica	Nelson Mandela Forum
Capacity: 5,000	Capacity: 6,500	Capacity: 10,710	Capacity: 5,500

== First round ==
- All times are Central European Summer Time (UTC+02:00).
- In the first round pool competitions, each pool played a round-robin schedule, with each team playing every other team. The top three teams advanced to the second round.

=== Pool A ===
Pool A featured host country Italy, as well as Egypt, Japan and Iran. Italy defeated all three teams, while the remaining teams each finished with a 1–2 record. Iran were eliminated by virtue of scoring the fewest points during the three-game schedule.

Pos	Team	Pld	W	L	Pts	SW	SL	SR	SPW	SPL	SPR	Qualification
1	Italy	3	3	0	6	9	2	4.500	262	207	1.266	Second round
2	Egypt	3	1	2	4	5	6	0.833	243	254	0.957	Second round
3	Japan	3	1	2	4	4	8	0.500	259	274	0.945	Second round
4	Iran	3	1	2	4	5	7	0.714	247	276	0.895	

Date	Time		Score		Set 1	Set 2	Set 3	Set 4	Set 5	Total	Report
25 Sep	17:05	Egypt	3–0	Iran	25–21	25–17	25–21			75–59	P2 P3
25 Sep	21:05	Italy	3–0	Japan	25–20	25–16	25–14			75–50	P2 P3
26 Sep	17:05	Iran	3–1	Japan	15–25	25–17	26–24	25–23		91–89	P2 P3
26 Sep	21:05	Egypt	0–3	Italy	20–25	17–25	23–25			60–75	P2 P3
27 Sep	17:05	Japan	3–2	Egypt	32–34	23–25	25–19	25–17	15–13	120–108	P2 P3
27 Sep	21:05	Italy	3–2	Iran	25–21	25–10	21–25	26–28	15–13	112–97	P2 P3

=== Pool B ===
Pool B featured reigning champions Brazil, as well as Cuba, Spain and Tunisia. Cuba won all three of their matches. Tunisia were defeated in every match and eliminated from the competition. Brazil and Cuba would face each other again in the tournament final, where Brazil would repeat as world champions.

Pos	Team	Pld	W	L	Pts	SW	SL	SR	SPW	SPL	SPR	Qualification
1	Cuba	3	3	0	6	9	4	2.250	296	263	1.125	Second round
2	Brazil	3	2	1	5	8	4	2.000	291	256	1.137	Second round
3	Spain	3	1	2	4	6	7	0.857	292	302	0.967	Second round
4	Tunisia	3	0	3	3	1	9	0.111	192	250	0.768	

Date	Time		Score		Set 1	Set 2	Set 3	Set 4	Set 5	Total	Report
25 Sep	17:05	Brazil	3–0	Tunisia	25–14	25–21	25–14			75–49	P2 P3
25 Sep	21:05	Spain	2–3	Cuba	25–23	18–25	19–25	25–20	13–15	100–108	P2 P3
26 Sep	17:05	Tunisia	0–3	Cuba	18–25	15–25	15–25			48–75	P2 P3
26 Sep	21:05	Brazil	3–1	Spain	30–28	21–25	25–20	25–19		101–92	P2 P3
27 Sep	17:05	Spain	3–1	Tunisia	25–23	25–22	25–27	25–23		100–95	P2 P3
27 Sep	21:05	Cuba	3–2	Brazil	34–32	18–25	23–25	25–21	15–12	115–115	P2 P3

=== Pool C ===
Pool C featured Russia, Puerto Rico, Cameroon and Australia. Russia won all their matches, while Australia were eliminated after going 0–3.

Pos	Team	Pld	W	L	Pts	SW	SL	SR	SPW	SPL	SPR	Qualification
1	Russia	3	3	0	6	9	3	3.000	283	224	1.263	Second round
2	Puerto Rico	3	2	1	5	8	4	2.000	272	264	1.030	Second round
3	Cameroon	3	1	2	4	3	7	0.429	213	237	0.899	Second round
4	Australia	3	0	3	3	3	9	0.333	253	296	0.855	

Date	Time		Score		Set 1	Set 2	Set 3	Set 4	Set 5	Total	Report
25 Sep	17:05	Russia	3–0	Cameroon	25–11	25–20	25–22			75–53	P2 P3
25 Sep	21:05	Australia	1–3	Puerto Rico	22–25	22–25	28–26	19–25		91–101	P2 P3
26 Sep	17:05	Cameroon	0–3	Puerto Rico	22–25	23–25	19–25			64–75	P2 P3
26 Sep	21:05	Russia	3–1	Australia	25–17	25–12	24–26	25–20		99–75	P2 P3
27 Sep	17:05	Australia	1–3	Cameroon	25–21	22–25	21–25	19–25		87–96	P2 P3
27 Sep	21:05	Puerto Rico	2–3	Russia	25–21	14–25	21–25	25–23	11–15	96–109	P2 P3

=== Pool D ===
Pool D featured the United States, Argentina, Mexico and Venezuela. Venezuela were eliminated after not winning a single set.

Pos	Team	Pld	W	L	Pts	SW	SL	SR	SPW	SPL	SPR	Qualification
1	United States	3	3	0	6	9	3	3.000	280	254	1.102	Second round
2	Argentina	3	2	1	5	7	4	1.750	259	228	1.136	Second round
3	Mexico	3	1	2	4	6	6	1.000	247	260	0.950	Second round
4	Venezuela	3	0	3	3	0	9	0.000	181	225	0.804	

Date	Time		Score		Set 1	Set 2	Set 3	Set 4	Set 5	Total	Report
25 Sep	17:05	Venezuela	0–3	Argentina	23–25	17–25	18–25			58–75	P2 P3
25 Sep	21:05	United States	3–2	Mexico	22–25	19–25	25–18	25–22	15–11	106–101	P2 P3
26 Sep	17:05	Argentina	3–1	Mexico	25–12	25–19	17–25	25–15		92–71	P2 P3
26 Sep	21:05	Venezuela	0–3	United States	19–25	23–25	19–25			61–75	P2 P3
27 Sep	17:05	Mexico	3–0	Venezuela	25–22	25–20	25–20			75–62	P2 P3
27 Sep	21:05	United States	3–1	Argentina	22–25	27–25	25–22	25–20		99–92	P2 P3

=== Pool E ===
Pool E featured France, Czech Republic, Bulgaria and China. China were eliminated after not winning a match.

Pos	Team	Pld	W	L	Pts	SW	SL	SR	SPW	SPL	SPR	Qualification
1	France	3	3	0	6	9	4	2.250	306	268	1.142	Second round
2	Czech Republic	3	2	1	5	8	5	1.600	302	300	1.007	Second round
3	Bulgaria	3	1	2	4	6	6	1.000	289	282	1.025	Second round
4	China	3	0	3	3	1	9	0.111	197	244	0.807	

Date	Time		Score		Set 1	Set 2	Set 3	Set 4	Set 5	Total	Report
25 Sep	17:05	France	3–2	Czech Republic	25–19	22–25	25–21	24–26	15–10	111–101	P2 P3
25 Sep	21:05	Bulgaria	3–0	China	25–14	25–19	25–22			75–55	P2 P3
26 Sep	17:05	Czech Republic	3–1	China	25–21	19–25	25–18	25–22		94–86	P2 P3
26 Sep	21:05	France	3–2	Bulgaria	25–22	23–25	25–17	28–30	19–17	120–111	P2 P3
27 Sep	17:05	Bulgaria	1–3	Czech Republic	23–25	25–27	30–28	25–27		103–107	P2 P3
27 Sep	21:05	China	0–3	France	17–25	20–25	19–25			56–75	P2 P3

=== Pool F ===
Pool F featured Poland, who won the silver medal in the last edition. The pool also featured Serbia, Germany and Canada.

Pos	Team	Pld	W	L	Pts	SW	SL	SR	SPW	SPL	SPR	Qualification
1	Poland	3	3	0	6	9	3	3.000	279	246	1.134	Second round
2	Serbia	3	1	2	4	5	6	0.833	250	243	1.029	Second round
3	Germany	3	1	2	4	5	6	0.833	237	250	0.948	Second round
4	Canada	3	1	2	4	3	7	0.429	215	242	0.888	

Date	Time		Score		Set 1	Set 2	Set 3	Set 4	Set 5	Total	Report
25 Sep	17:05	Poland	3–0	Canada	25–22	25–21	25–13			75–56	P2 P3
25 Sep	21:05	Germany	0–3	Serbia	21–25	21–25	13–25			55–75	P2 P3
26 Sep	17:05	Canada	3–1	Serbia	25–20	25–22	17–25	25–23		92–90	P2 P3
26 Sep	21:05	Poland	3–2	Germany	25–20	21–25	25–22	22–25	15–13	108–105	P2 P3
27 Sep	17:05	Germany	3–0	Canada	27–25	25–22	25–20			77–67	P2 P3
27 Sep	21:05	Serbia	1–3	Poland	19–25	18–25	25–21	23–25		85–96	P2 P3

== Second round ==
- All times are Central European Summer Time (UTC+02:00).
- In the second round, participants were divided into six pools of three teams, pools G–N, with each pool again playing a round-robin. The bottom team were eliminated from the competition, while the top two advanced to the third round.

=== Pool G ===
Pool G featured host Italy, as well as Germany and Puerto Rico. Puerto Rico were eliminated after losing both matches.

Pos	Team	Pld	W	L	Pts	SW	SL	SR	SPW	SPL	SPR	Qualification
1	Italy	2	2	0	4	6	2	3.000	189	166	1.139	Third round
2	Germany	2	1	1	3	4	3	1.333	157	158	0.994	Third round
3	Puerto Rico	2	0	2	2	1	6	0.167	146	168	0.869	

Date	Time		Score		Set 1	Set 2	Set 3	Set 4	Set 5	Total	Report
30 Sep	17:05	Puerto Rico	0–3	Germany	22–25	22–25	18–25			62–75	P2 P3
1 Oct	21:05	Germany	1–3	Italy	25–21	18–25	21–25	18–25		82–96	P2 P3
2 Oct	21:05	Italy	3–1	Puerto Rico	25–22	25–16	18–25	25–21		93–84	P2 P3

=== Pool H ===
Pool H featured Serbia, Cuba and Mexico. Mexico were eliminated after being defeated in both matches.

Pos	Team	Pld	W	L	Pts	SW	SL	SR	SPW	SPL	SPR	Qualification
1	Serbia	2	2	0	4	6	1	6.000	166	145	1.145	Third round
2	Cuba	2	1	1	3	4	3	1.333	162	148	1.095	Third round
3	Mexico	2	0	2	2	0	6	0.000	117	152	0.770	

Date	Time		Score		Set 1	Set 2	Set 3	Set 4	Set 5	Total	Report
30 Sep	17:05	Cuba	1–3	Serbia	25–16	19–25	22–25	19–25		85–91	P2 P3
1 Oct	21:05	Mexico	0–3	Cuba	17–25	25–27	15–25			57–77	P2 P3
2 Oct	17:05	Serbia	3–0	Mexico	25–23	25–18	25–19			75–60	P2 P3

=== Pool I ===
Pool I featured Spain, Russia and Egypt. Egypt were eliminated after not winning a match.

Pos	Team	Pld	W	L	Pts	SW	SL	SR	SPW	SPL	SPR	Qualification
1	Spain	2	2	0	4	6	3	2.000	207	189	1.095	Third round
2	Russia	2	1	1	3	5	3	1.667	179	160	1.119	Third round
3	Egypt	2	0	2	2	1	6	0.167	141	178	0.792	

Date	Time		Score		Set 1	Set 2	Set 3	Set 4	Set 5	Total	Report
30 Sep	21:05	Russia	3–0	Egypt	25–21	25–17	25–18			75–56	P2 P3
1 Oct	17:05	Spain	3–2	Russia	17–25	22–25	25–21	25–20	15–13	104–104	P2 P3
2 Oct	17:05	Egypt	1–3	Spain	20–25	30–28	16–25	19–25		85–103	P2 P3

=== Pool L ===
Pool L featured the Czech Republic, United States and Cameroon. Cameroon did not win a match and were eliminated from the competition.

Pos	Team	Pld	W	L	Pts	SW	SL	SR	SPW	SPL	SPR	Qualification
1	Czech Republic	2	2	0	4	6	0	MAX	150	115	1.304	Third round
2	United States	2	1	1	3	3	5	0.600	176	168	1.048	Third round
3	Cameroon	2	0	2	2	2	6	0.333	145	188	0.771	

Date	Time		Score		Set 1	Set 2	Set 3	Set 4	Set 5	Total	Report
30 Sep	17:05	United States	0–3	Czech Republic	19–25	22–25	22–25			63–75	P2 P3
1 Oct	21:05	Cameroon	2–3	United States	25–23	14–25	27–25	20–25	7–15	93–113	P2 P3
2 Oct	17:05	Czech Republic	3–0	Cameroon	25–17	25–18	25–17			75–52	P2 P3

=== Pool M ===
Pool M featured Argentina, France and Japan. Japan did not win a match and were eliminated.

Pos	Team	Pld	W	L	Pts	SW	SL	SR	SPW	SPL	SPR	Qualification
1	Argentina	2	2	0	4	6	2	3.000	182	166	1.096	Third round
2	France	2	1	1	3	4	3	1.333	161	155	1.039	Third round
3	Japan	2	0	2	2	1	6	0.167	144	166	0.867	

Date	Time		Score		Set 1	Set 2	Set 3	Set 4	Set 5	Total	Report
30 Sep	21:05	France	1–3	Argentina	25–16	17–25	23–25	21–25		86–91	P2 P3
1 Oct	17:05	Japan	0–3	France	19–25	22–25	23–25			64–75	P2 P3
2 Oct	21:05	Argentina	3–1	Japan	25–22	16–25	25–14	25–19		91–80	P2 P3

=== Pool N ===
Pool N featured Bulgaria, Brazil and Poland. Bulgaria swept eventual champion Brazil in three sets. Poland did not win a match and were eliminated.

Pos	Team	Pld	W	L	Pts	SW	SL	SR	SPW	SPL	SPR	Qualification
1	Bulgaria	2	2	0	4	6	0	MAX	150	115	1.304	Third round
2	Brazil	2	1	1	3	3	3	1.000	133	131	1.015	Third round
3	Poland	2	0	2	2	0	6	0.000	113	150	0.753	

Date	Time		Score		Set 1	Set 2	Set 3	Set 4	Set 5	Total	Report
30 Sep	21:05	Poland	0–3	Brazil	16–25	20–25	20–25			56–75	P2 P3
1 Oct	17:05	Bulgaria	3–0	Poland	25–22	25–18	25–17			75–57	P2 P3
2 Oct	21:05	Brazil	0–3	Bulgaria	18–25	20–25	20–25			58–75	P2 P3

== Third round ==
- All times are Central European Summer Time (UTC+02:00).
- In the third round, the twelve remaining teams were divided into four pools of three. No eliminations took place in the third round. The top finishers in each pool were seeded into the championship bracket for first to fourth place. The second finishers competed in a bracket to determine fifth to eighth place, while the bottom teams competed in a bracket to determine ninth through twelfth place.

=== Pool O ===
In pool O, Italy moved on to the semifinal match, the USA advanced to the fifth to eighth bracket and France moved on to the ninth to twelfth place competition.

Pos	Team	Pld	W	L	Pts	SW	SL	SR	SPW	SPL	SPR	Qualification
1	Italy	2	2	0	4	6	2	3.000	192	180	1.067	Semifinals
2	United States	2	1	1	3	4	3	1.333	171	145	1.179	5th–8th semifinals
3	France	2	0	2	2	1	6	0.167	137	175	0.783	9th–12th semifinals

Date	Time		Score		Set 1	Set 2	Set 3	Set 4	Set 5	Total	Report
4 Oct	17:05	France	0–3	United States	16–25	14–25	23–25			53–75	P2 P3
5 Oct	21:05	United States	1–3	Italy	25–14	23–25	26–28	22–25		96–92	P2 P3
6 Oct	21:05	Italy	3–1	France	25–18	25–20	25–27	25–19		100–84	P2 P3

=== Pool P ===
Pool P saw Serbia advance to the semifinal. Russia advanced to the fifth to eighth bracket and Argentina to the ninth to twelfth place event.

Pos	Team	Pld	W	L	Pts	SW	SL	SR	SPW	SPL	SPR	Qualification
1	Serbia	2	2	0	4	6	2	3.000	192	177	1.085	Semifinals
2	Russia	2	1	1	3	4	3	1.333	172	150	1.147	5th–8th semifinals
3	Argentina	2	0	2	2	1	6	0.167	134	171	0.784	9th–12th semifinals

Date	Time		Score		Set 1	Set 2	Set 3	Set 4	Set 5	Total	Report
4 Oct	17:05	Serbia	3–1	Argentina	25–15	21–25	25–22	25–18		96–80	P2 P3
5 Oct	17:05	Russia	1–3	Serbia	26–28	25–16	21–25	25–27		97–96	P2 P3
6 Oct	17:05	Argentina	0–3	Russia	22–25	17–25	15–25			54–75	P2 P3

=== Pool Q ===
In pool Q, Cuba advanced to the semifinal. Bulgaria moved on to the fifth to eighth place bracket and Spain to the ninth to twelfth.

Pos	Team	Pld	W	L	Pts	SW	SL	SR	SPW	SPL	SPR	Qualification
1	Cuba	2	2	0	4	6	3	2.000	208	206	1.010	Semifinals
2	Bulgaria	2	1	1	3	5	4	1.250	218	210	1.038	5th–8th semifinals
3	Spain	2	0	2	2	2	6	0.333	183	193	0.948	9th–12th semifinals

Date	Time		Score		Set 1	Set 2	Set 3	Set 4	Set 5	Total	Report
4 Oct	21:05	Spain	1–3	Bulgaria	21–25	25–27	28–26	18–25		92–103	P2 P3
5 Oct	21:05	Cuba	3–1	Spain	25–22	15–25	25–22	25–22		90–91	P2 P3
6 Oct	21:05	Bulgaria	2–3	Cuba	25–22	23–25	28–26	28–30	11–15	115–118	P2 P3

=== Pool R ===
In pool R, Brazil advanced to the semifinal. Germany to the fifth to eighth bracket and the Czech Republic to the ninth to twelfth bracket.

Pos	Team	Pld	W	L	Pts	SW	SL	SR	SPW	SPL	SPR	Qualification
1	Brazil	2	2	0	4	6	2	3.000	185	155	1.194	Semifinals
2	Germany	2	1	1	3	3	3	1.000	131	129	1.016	5th–8th semifinals
3	Czech Republic	2	0	2	2	2	6	0.333	153	185	0.827	9th–12th semifinals

Date	Time		Score		Set 1	Set 2	Set 3	Set 4	Set 5	Total	Report
4 Oct	21:05	Czech Republic	2–3	Brazil	20–25	25–22	25–23	21–25	8–15	99–110	P2 P3
5 Oct	17:05	Germany	3–0	Czech Republic	25–23	25–18	25–13			75–54	P2 P3
6 Oct	17:05	Brazil	3–0	Germany	25–17	25–20	25–19			75–56	P2 P3

== Final round ==
- All times are Central European Summer Time (UTC+02:00).

=== 9th–12th places ===
9th–12th semifinals
8 October
Argentina	3
Spain	1
8 October
France	0
Czech Republic	3

9th place match
9 October
Argentina	3
Czech Republic	1
11th place match
9 October
Spain	1
France	3

==== 9th–12th semifinals ====
Date	Time		Score		Set 1	Set 2	Set 3	Set 4	Set 5	Total	Report
8 Oct	17:05	Argentina	3–1	Spain	23–25	25–19	25–19	26–24		99–87	P2 P3
8 Oct	21:05	France	0–3	Czech Republic	21–25	20–25	16–25			57–75	P2 P3

==== 11th place match ====
Date	Time		Score		Set 1	Set 2	Set 3	Set 4	Set 5	Total	Report
9 Oct	17:05	Spain	1–3	France	17–25	23–25	25–16	21–25		86–91	P2 P3

==== 9th place match ====
Date	Time		Score		Set 1	Set 2	Set 3	Set 4	Set 5	Total	Report
9 Oct	21:05	Argentina	3–1	Czech Republic	25–22	18–25	25–21	25–22		93–90	P2 P3

=== 5th–8th places ===
5th–8th semifinals
8 October
Russia	3
Bulgaria	1
8 October
United States	3
Germany	0

5th place match
9 October
Russia	3
United States	0
7th place match
9 October
Bulgaria	3
Germany	0

==== 5th–8th semifinals ====
Date	Time		Score		Set 1	Set 2	Set 3	Set 4	Set 5	Total	Report
8 Oct	17:05	Russia	3–1	Bulgaria	25–20	26–24	20–25	25–23		96–92	P2 P3
8 Oct	21:05	United States	3–0	Germany	25–22	25–20	25–23			75–65	P2 P3

==== 7th place match ====
Date	Time		Score		Set 1	Set 2	Set 3	Set 4	Set 5	Total	Report
9 Oct	17:05	Bulgaria	3–0	Germany	26–24	26–24	25–21			77–69	P2 P3

==== 5th place match ====
Date	Time		Score		Set 1	Set 2	Set 3	Set 4	Set 5	Total	Report
9 Oct	21:05	Russia	3–0	United States	25–19	25–21	25–19			75–59	P2 P3

=== Final four ===
Semifinals
9 October
Serbia	2
Cuba	3
9 October
Italy	1
Brazil	3

Final
10 October
Cuba	0
Brazil	3
3rd place match
10 October
Serbia	3
Italy	1

==== Semifinals ====
Date	Time		Score		Set 1	Set 2	Set 3	Set 4	Set 5	Total	Report
9 Oct	17:05	Serbia	2–3	Cuba	25–22	17–25	29–31	25–22	14–16	110–116	P2 P3
9 Oct	21:15	Italy	1–3	Brazil	15–25	22–25	25–23	17–25		79–98	P2 P3

==== 3rd place match ====
In the bronze medal match, Serbia defeated hosts Italy, three sets to one. It was the country's first medal since they were runners-up in 1998 (then as Yugoslavia).

Date	Time		Score		Set 1	Set 2	Set 3	Set 4	Set 5	Total	Report
10 Oct	17:05	Serbia	3–1	Italy	25–21	25–20	26–28	25–19		101–88	P2 P3

==== Final ====
The final was a rematch of Brazil and Cuba, who had met earlier in the first round with Cuba winning 3 sets to 2 in an upset. The final was a different story however, with Brazil winning easily in straight sets 25–22, 25–14, 25–22; one Xinhua journalist called it a 'practice match' for Brazil. Brazil took advantage of a large number of Cuban mistakes, perhaps resulting from the young age of the Cuban team. Leandro Vissotto led Brazil in points with 19 and closed the match with a spike. The match was played before a crowd of 11,605 which included a number of Brazilian football stars based in Italy.

Date	Time		Score		Set 1	Set 2	Set 3	Set 4	Set 5	Total	Report
10 Oct	21:15	Cuba	0–3	Brazil	22–25	14–25	22–25			58–75	P2 P3

== Final standing ==
Rank	Team
1st place, gold medalist(s)	Brazil
2nd place, silver medalist(s)	Cuba
3rd place, bronze medalist(s)	Serbia
4	Italy
5	Russia
6	United States
7	Bulgaria
8	Germany
9	Argentina
10	Czech Republic
11	France
12	Spain
13	Cameroon
13	Egypt
13	Japan
13	Mexico
13	Poland
13	Puerto Rico
19	Australia
19	Canada
19	China
19	Iran
19	Tunisia
19	Venezuela

2010 Men's World champions

Brazil
3rd title

14–man Roster
Bruno, Alan, Sidão, Vissotto, Giba (c), Murilo, Théo, João Paulo, J. Bravo, Rodrigão, Lucas, Marlon, Dante, Mario Jr.
Head coach
Bernardinho

== Awards ==
- Most valuable player
  (Brazil) Murilo Endres
- Best scorer
  (Spain) Ibán Pérez
- Best spiker
  (Russia) Maxim Mikhaylov
- Best blocker
  (Cuba) Robertlandy Simón
- Best server
  (United States) Clayton Stanley
- Best setter
  (Serbia) Nikola Grbić
- Best libero
  (Germany) Ferdinand Tille

== Marketing ==
=== Symbol ===
Volly was the name chosen by Internet users and students of the 10 host cities of the World Championship (Ancona, Catania, Florence, Milan, Modena, Reggio Calabria, Rome, Turin, Trieste and Verona), after months of voting. The second most popular name for the mascot was "Fly," while "Mimmo," "Italo" and "Gump" finished further down the list.

=== Sponsors ===
- Kinder Ferrero SpA
- Mikasa
- ICS
- Lombardy
- Milan
- Asics
- Fiat S.p.A.

== Broadcasting ==
Region	TV station
Europe	BNT; Sport TV; RAI; Sport1; Canal+; TV4; Polsat; RTVE; NTV Plus; Channel 4; Pragosport
Middle East	ASBU; Kuwait TV; Dubai Sports; ADM; ERTU; IRIB; Saudi 2
Australasia & Africa	SuperSport; TBS; CGTN; PCCW; VCTV
Americas	Globo; Universal; Rogers; ESPN; TVC; DIRECTV; TVE Venezolana

== See also ==
- 2010 FIVB Women's World Championship
