= Edgar Eriakha =

Nigerian Television Personality and Podcaster

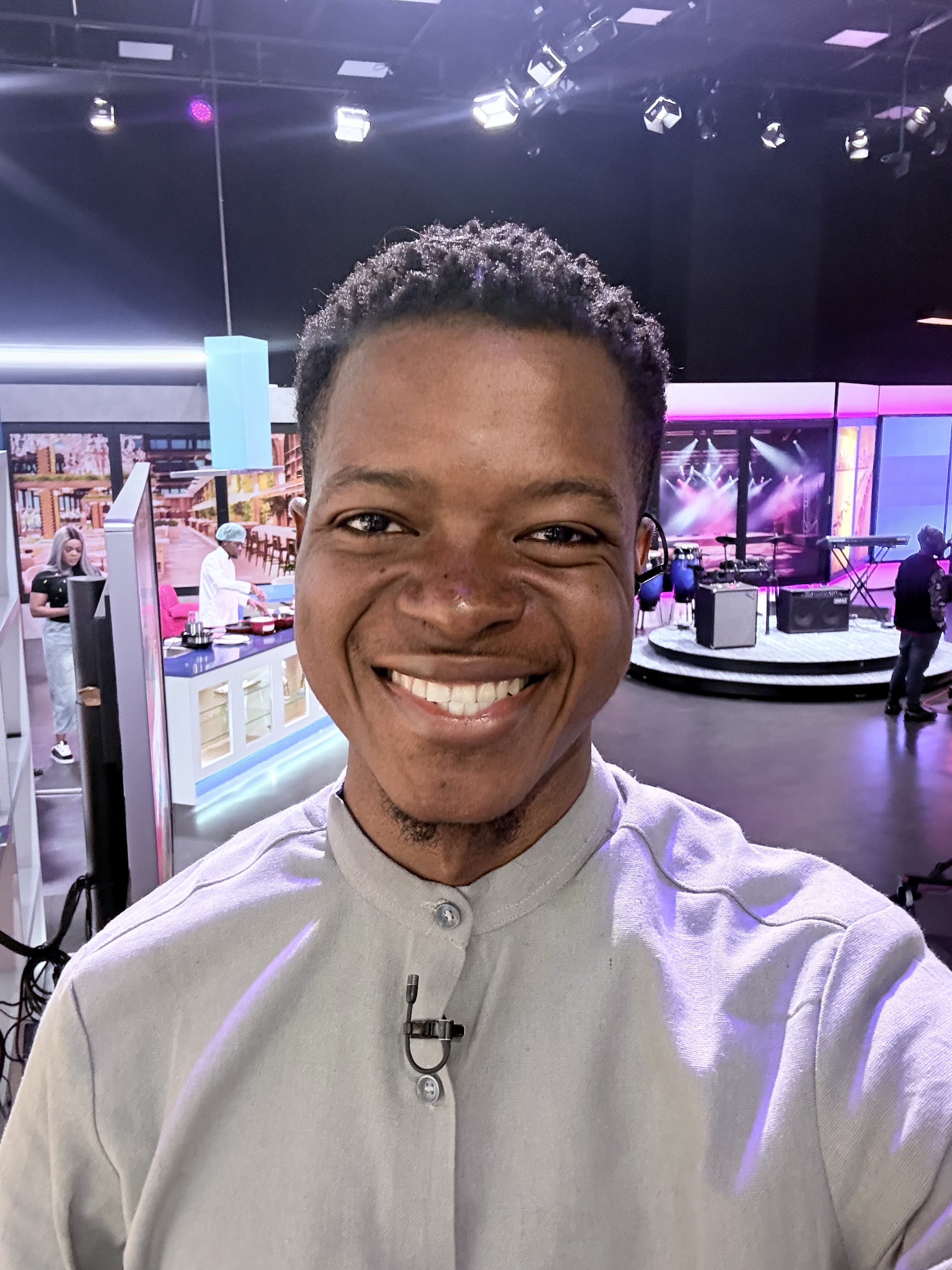
- Born: Edgar Oseiwe Eriakha; March 26, 1997 (age 29); Lagos, Nigeria
- Education: University of Lagos

Edgar Eriakha, also known as Check Edgar, is a Nigerian television presenter, podcast host, actor and voice-over artist. He is best known as host of the TVC Entertainment's morning show Wake Up Nigeria and the game show, Quick Kash. He also hosts the comedy podcast Why Am I Still Single?

== Background ==
Edgar was born on March 26, 1997, in Lagos, but is originally from Edo State, Nigeria. He attended Best Foundation School, St. Mishack Primary School, and Bodija International College in Ibadan, Oyo State. He also studied Creative Arts at the University of Lagos, Nigeria.

== Career ==
Edgar began his career as an actor and blogger. He also worked as a commercial writer for Pulse Nigeria, later gained prominence on social media creating comedy sketches and skits during the lockdown in 2020.

=== TV Show Hosting ===
In 2024, Edgar landed an audition for a TV presenter at TVC Entertainment after a representative from the channel had followed his content online and reached out to him on social media. He began co-hosting the channel's early morning show, Wake Up Nigeria in September 2024. He also hosts the channel's game show Quick Kash where three contestants compete for a jackpot prize of 500,000 Naira.

=== Acting ===
In 2019, Edgar starred in the Tosin Igho-directed action thriller Seven alongside Efa Iwara, Richard Mofe-Damijo and more. He has performed in several stage plays including Holding Talks in 2019 and King of My Heart in 2024. Edgar's performance at King's College London during Africa Week in March 2025 was described by the university's Global Cultures Institute as “a powerful dramatic performance that inspired discussion on the climate emergency.”

=== Podcast ===
In August 2024, Edgar launched the comedy podcast Why Am I Still Single? As at April 2026, the podcast has recorded over 128,000 downloads, and garnered a dedicated fanbase called Checkmates. In late 2025, the podcast made Spotify's list of the “Editors’ Podcast Picks”.

== Filmography ==
- Seven (2019) — as Tega
- Holy Trouble
