= Integrated Conservation and Development Project =

Type of biodiversity conservation project

Integrated Conservation and Development Projects (Note: Other names: People-centered conservation and development; Eco-development; Grassroots conservation; Community-based natural resource management; Community wildlife management) (ICDPs) are biodiversity conservation projects with rural development components. It is an approach that aspires to combine social development with conservation. These projects aim to attend to biodiversity conservation objectives through the use of socio-economic investment tools. The World Wide Fund for Nature (WWF) first introduced ICDPs in the mid-1980s; they wanted to address some of the problems associated with the "fines and fences" (non-participatory) approach to conservation.

== History ==
The Wildlands & Human Needs Program was initiated in 1985 by WWF, and incorporated 19 ICDPs in 12 countries in Africa and South America. They wanted to improve the quality of life of rural people through projects that integrated the management of natural resources with economic development. Today, there are around 300 ICDPs.

== Characteristics ==
ICDPs are typically linked to a protected area, such as a national park. They typically receive funding from external sources and are initiated and managed by conservation organizations and development agencies.

Although biodiversity conservation is the primary goal, ICDPs also aim to:

- Address the social and economic requirements of communities who might threaten biodiversity
- Improve the relationships between state-managed protected areas and local communities
- Benefit indigenous populations through creation of jobs – particularly in agriculture – and revenue from tourism

ICDPs operate on the following assumptions:

- Diversified local livelihood options will reduce human pressures on biodiversity, leading to improved conservation.
- Local people and their way of life comprise the most important threat to the biodiversity of the area in question.
- ICDPs offer sustainable alternatives to traditional approaches to protected area management.

== Criticism ==
Conservation organizations have faced criticism over their relationship with the communities in which ICDPs operate; in particular, they have been criticized for designing projects with little to no input from local communities. They have also been reported to refuse bearing or supporting legal battles over land because they find it to be "too political". However, WWF claims that their ICDPs are implemented in collaboration with local organizations and in consideration of social and economic factors within communities.

ICDPs have been accused of negatively impacting local communities. For example, it can be difficult for them to market what is grown as part of agroforestry and organic gardening projects. Additionally, minority ethnic groups and women are rarely accounted for in the redistribution of costs and benefits. Such groups may face barriers to participation due to traditional social hierarchies, leading to less prospects for equal opportunities and collective action.

ICDPs have been criticized for their focus on alleviating the impact of local communities on protected areas, causing them to overlook external factors like growing market demand for forest and wildlife products, demographic pressures, and vested interests like illegal logging, mineral extraction and ranching. In addition, ICDPs that are funded internationally may not be financially or economically sustainable once their external funding has been exhausted.

== Notable ICDPs ==
- Annapurna Conservation Area Project, Nepal
- Bwindi Impenetrable Forest, Uganda
- Lake Mburo National Park, Uganda
- Amboró National Park, Bolivia
- Yancheng Coastal Wetlands, China
- Crater Mountain Wildlife Management Area, Papua New Guinea
- Mount Elgon, Uganda
- Ngorongoro Conservation Area, Tanzania
- Kilim Ijum, Cameroon
- Ostional Wildlife Refuge, Costa Rica
- Projects funded by the UK Department for International Development (DFID)

== See also ==
- Conservation International
- World Wildlife Fund
- The Nature Conservancy
- Ford Foundation
