= Yancheng Coastal Wetlands =

Nature reserve in Jiangsu, China

Coordinates: 33°32′N 120°37′E

Designations

Ramsar Wetland
- Official name: Yancheng National Nature Reserve
- Designated: 11 January 2002
- Reference no.: 1156

The Yancheng Coastal Wetlands is the largest coastal wetlands nature reserve in China. It is situated close to Yancheng, Jiangsu province, China.

== Location ==
The reserve is located in the east part of Yancheng, Jiangsu Province and in the coastal area of SheYang, DaFeng, XiangShui, BinHai and DongTai counties. The coast is 582 kilometers long and the area covers 453,000 hectares. The reserve faces the south of Yellow Sea and backs by the north flatland of JiangSu Province.

It is named after the Dongbei and Liao Rivers is connected to the Songnen Plain through the Yellow River Valley; a small plain lies north of Dongting Lake in the west.

== Species ==
It has more than 600 kinds of natural vegetation, 379 kinds of birds, 281 kinds of shellfish, 590 kinds of insects, 47 kinds of mammal and another 490 kinds of plants. In 1992, The Nation Rare Birds Nature Reserve was built in Yancheng Wetlands. The Yancheng Nature Reserve is especially known for the red-crowned cranes. Every winter, hundreds of red-crowned crane migrate to wintering sites in the Yancheng Nature Reserve. There are about 3,000,000 birds fly through Yancheng. Among these birds, more than 500,000 birds overwinter in Yancheng Nature Reserve.

== See also ==
- Geography of China
