= TVC News =

Nigerian television news channel

- Type: Private company
- Country: Nigeria
- Broadcast area: Worldwide
- Headquarters: Lagos

Programming
- Language: English

Ownership
- Owner: TVC Communications
- Key people: Mrs Victoria Ajayi (Group Managing Director/CEO), Lemi Olalemi (Special Advisor to the CEO), Babajide Otitoju (Director of News and Editor-in-chief,

History
- Founded: 2012
- Launched: 28 February 2013 (Nigeria); 17 June 2013 (UK)

Links
- Website: www.tvcnews.tv

TVC News is a Nigerian news 24-hour television news channel based in Lagos. The channel airs on British Sky Broadcasting Group Plc (BSKYb) in the UK, Naspers Ltd. (NPN)'s DStv and Startimes in Nigeria, and Multi TV in Ghana.

Former CEO Nigel Parsons states "Without shying away from reporting the conflicts or the corruption, the famines or the wars, the mission of TVC News is also to tell the many positive stories coming out of Africa. Stories – good or bad – will be told 'through African eyes'."

The network aired its first public broadcasting run on 28 February 2013. It began airing in the UK on BSkyB on 17 June 2013. In its first few months the network's staff has received awards from the Association for International Broadcasting (AIB) and the International Center for Journalists based out of Washington, D.C. As of 2014 the station is said to have reached about five million households in Africa and Europe with interest from cable and satellite providers to expand its market share.

The channel hosts several programs including Esplash, YourView, Wake Up Nigeria, and Quick kash. The Wake Up Nigeria show is co-hosted by Titi Oyinsan, Mike Mesikenor, Rume Paulson, Winfrey Agbelese, Mary Bashua-Alimi, and Edgar Eriakha who also hosts the game show Quick Kash.
