= 2025 FIVB Men's Volleyball World Championship statistics =

The final tournament took place in two cities of the Philippines from 12 to 28 September 2025.

Italy claimed their fifth title, defeating the silver medalist Bulgaria from 1970 World Championship in the final.

== Preliminary round ==
- All times are Philippine Standard Time (UTC+08:00).

=== Pool A ===
Venue: SM Mall of Asia Arena, Pasay City

Pos	Team	Pld	W	L	Pts	SW	SL	SR	SPW	SPL	SPR	Qualification
1	Tunisia	3	2	1	6	7	3	2.333	234	210	1.114	Final round
2	Iran	3	2	1	5	7	6	1.167	293	289	1.014	Final round
3	Philippines (H)	3	1	2	4	5	7	0.714	269	279	0.964	
4	Egypt	3	1	2	3	4	7	0.571	244	262	0.931	

Source: FIVB Men's World Championship - Standings
(H) Host

Total matches played : 6
Total sets played : 23 (3.8 per match)
Total points played : 1040 (173.3 per match)

=== Pool B ===
Venue: Araneta Coliseum, Quezon City

Pos	Team	Pld	W	L	Pts	SW	SL	SR	SPW	SPL	SPR	Qualification
1	Poland	3	3	0	9	9	1	9.000	256	209	1.225	Final round
2	Netherlands	3	2	1	6	7	4	1.750	267	260	1.027	Final round
3	Qatar	3	1	2	3	4	7	0.571	241	266	0.906	
4	Romania	3	0	3	0	1	9	0.111	227	256	0.887	

Source: FIVB Men's World Championship - Standings

Total matches played : 6
Total sets played : 21 (3.5 per match)
Total points played : 991 (165.2 per match)

=== Pool C ===
Venue: Araneta Coliseum, Quezon City

Pos	Team	Pld	W	L	Pts	SW	SL	SR	SPW	SPL	SPR	Qualification
1	Argentina	3	3	0	7	9	5	1.800	309	302	1.023	Final round
2	Finland	3	2	1	6	8	6	1.333	304	294	1.034	Final round
3	France	3	1	2	5	7	6	1.167	291	262	1.111	
4	South Korea	3	0	3	0	2	9	0.222	219	265	0.826	

Source: FIVB Men's World Championship - Standings

Total matches played : 6
Total sets played : 26 (4.3 per match)
Total points played : 1123 (187.2 per match)

=== Pool D ===
Venue: SM Mall of Asia Arena, Pasay City

Pos	Team	Pld	W	L	Pts	SW	SL	SR	SPW	SPL	SPR	Qualification
1	United States	3	3	0	9	9	1	9.000	250	202	1.238	Final round
2	Portugal	3	2	1	5	6	6	1.000	262	262	1.000	Final round
3	Cuba	3	1	2	3	5	6	0.833	249	258	0.965	
4	Colombia	3	0	3	1	2	9	0.222	220	259	0.849	

Source: FIVB Men's World Championship - Standings

Total matches played : 6
Total sets played : 22 (3.7 per match)
Total points played : 981 (163.5 per match)

=== Pool E ===
Venue: SM Mall of Asia Arena, Pasay City

Pos	Team	Pld	W	L	Pts	SW	SL	SR	SPW	SPL	SPR	Qualification
1	Bulgaria	3	3	0	8	9	2	4.500	271	217	1.249	Final round
2	Slovenia	3	2	1	7	8	4	2.000	269	258	1.043	Final round
3	Germany	3	1	2	3	4	6	0.667	252	249	1.012	
4	Chile	3	0	3	0	0	9	0.000	157	225	0.698	

Source: FIVB Men's World Championship - Standings

Total matches played : 6
Total sets played : 21 (3.5 per match)
Total points played : 949 (158.2 per match)

=== Pool F ===
Venue: Araneta Coliseum, Quezon City

Pos	Team	Pld	W	L	Pts	SW	SL	SR	SPW	SPL	SPR	Qualification
1	Belgium	3	3	0	8	9	2	4.500	258	215	1.200	Final round
2	Italy	3	2	1	7	8	3	2.667	256	221	1.158	Final round
3	Ukraine	3	1	2	3	3	6	0.500	191	190	1.005	
4	Algeria	3	0	3	0	0	9	0.000	146	225	0.649	

Source: FIVB Men's World Championship - Standings

Total matches played : 6
Total sets played : 20 (3.3 per match)
Total points played : 851 (141.8 per match)

=== Pool G ===
Venue: Araneta Coliseum, Quezon City

Pos	Team	Pld	W	L	Pts	SW	SL	SR	SPW	SPL	SPR	Qualification
1	Turkey	3	3	0	9	9	1	9.000	250	196	1.276	Final round
2	Canada	3	2	1	6	6	4	1.500	238	226	1.053	Final round
3	Japan	3	1	2	3	3	6	0.500	201	199	1.010	
4	Libya	3	0	3	0	2	9	0.222	206	274	0.752	

Source: FIVB Men's World Championship - Standings

Total matches played : 6
Total sets played : 20 (3.3 per match)
Total points played : 895 (149.2 per match)

=== Pool H ===
Venue: SM Mall of Asia Arena, Pasay City

Pos	Team	Pld	W	L	Pts	SW	SL	SR	SPW	SPL	SPR	Qualification
1	Serbia	3	2	1	6	6	3	2.000	219	203	1.079	Final round
2	Czech Republic	3	2	1	6	6	3	2.000	202	201	1.005	Final round
3	Brazil	3	2	1	6	6	4	1.500	233	217	1.074	
4	China	3	0	3	0	1	9	0.111	216	249	0.867	

Source: FIVB Men's World Championship - Standings

Total matches played : 6
Total sets played : 19 (3.2 per match)
Total points played : 870 (145 per match)

== Final round ==
Round of 16
23 September
Tunisia	0
Czech Republic	3
23 September
Serbia	2
Iran	3
22 September
United States	3
Slovenia	1
22 September
Bulgaria	3
Portugal	0
20 September
Poland	3
Canada	1
20 September
Turkey	3
Netherlands	1
21 September
Argentina	0
Italy	3
21 September
Belgium	3
Finland	0

Quarterfinals
25 September
Czech Republic	3
Iran	1
25 September
United States	2
Bulgaria	3
24 September
Poland	3
Turkey	0
24 September
Italy	3
Belgium	0

Semifinals
27 September
Czech Republic	1
Bulgaria	3
27 September
Poland	0
Italy	3

Final
28 September
Bulgaria	1
Italy	3
3rd place match
28 September
Czech Republic	1
Poland	3

Total matches played : 16
Total sets played : 59 (3.7 per match)
Total points played : 2,622 (163.9 per match)

== Tournament statistics ==
=== Host cities ===
- Pasay City, Quezon City

=== Venues ===
- Pasay City : SM Mall of Asia Arena (20,000)
- Quezon City : Araneta Coliseum (14,429)

=== Attendance ===
- Matches played : 64
- Attendance (preliminary round) (played 48) : 128,823 (2,684 per match)
- Attendance (final round) (played 16) : 88,107 (5,507 per match)
- Total attendance on tournament : 216,930 (3,390 per match)
- Arena SM Mall of Asia Arena total attendance (played 40) : 172,579 (4,314 per match)
- Arena Smart Araneta Coliseum total attendance (played 24) : 44,351 (1,848 per match)
- Most attendance :
  16,429 - Bulgaria v. Italy, SM Mall of Asia Arena, Pasay City on 28 September 2025.
  14,240 - Philippines v. Iran, SM Mall of Asia Arena, Pasay City on 18 September 2025.
  10,474 - United States v. Bulgaria, SM Mall of Asia Arena, Pasay City on 25 September 2025.
- Fewest attendance :
  312 - Qatar v. Romania, Smart Araneta Coliseum, Quezon City on 17 September 2025.
  422 - Ukraine v. Algeria, Smart Araneta Coliseum, Quezon City on 16 September 2025.
  502 - Argentina v. South Korea, Smart Araneta Coliseum, Quezon City on 16 September 2025.

=== Matches ===
- Matches finished in 3 sets: 34 (53%)
- Matches finished in 4 sets: 21 (33%)
- Matches finished in 5 sets: 9 (14%)
- Total matches played : 64 (100%)
- Most matches wins : 6 - Italy, Bulgaria, Poland
- Fewest matches wins : 0 - Colombia, South Korea, Libya, Romania, China, Chile, Algeria
- Most matches lost : 3 - Czech Republic, Colombia, South Korea, Libya, Romania, China, Chile, Algeria
- Fewest matches lost : 1 - Italy, Bulgaria, Poland, United States, Turkey, Belgium, Argentina, Brazil
- Longest match played (duration) :
  134 min. - Serbia vs. Iran (2h,14m)
  129 min. - France vs. Argentina (2h,09m)
  127 min. - United States vs. Bulgaria (2h,07m)
  125 min. - Argentina vs. Finland (2h,05m)
  125 min. - Philippines vs. Iran (2h,05m)
- Shortest match played (duration) :
  57 min. - Ukraine vs. Algeria (0h,57m)
  62 min. - France vs. South Korea (1h,02m)
  64 min. - Italy vs. Algeria (1h,04m)

=== Sets ===
- Total sets (preliminary round) : 172 (3.6 per match)
- Total sets (final round) : 59 (3.7 per match)
- Total sets scored : 231 (3.6 per match)
- Most sets played : 27 - Bulgaria (19/8)
- Most sets wins : 20 - Italy (20/4)
- Fewest sets wins : 0 - Chile, Algeria
- Most sets lost : 11 - Iran
- Fewest sets lost : 4 - Italy (20/4)
- Most 5 sets played : 2 - Argentina (2/0), Bulgaria (2/0), Iran (2/0), France (0/2)
- Most 5 sets win : 2 - Argentina (2/0), Bulgaria (2/0), Iran (2/0)
- Most 5 sets lost : 2 - France (0/2)
- Highest set ratio : 5.000 - Italy (20/4)
- Lowest set ratio : 0.000 - Chile (0/9), Algeria (0/9)

=== Points ===
- Total points (preliminary round) : 7,700 (160.4 per match)
- Total points (final round) : 2,622 (163.9 per match)
- Total points scored : 10,322 (161.3 per match)
- Most points wins : 622 - Bulgaria (622/554)
- Fewest points wins : 146 - Algeria (146/225)
- Most points played (w+l) : 1,176 - Bulgaria (622/554)
- Fewest points played (w+l) : 371 - Algeria (146/225)
- Most points lost : 548 - Czech Republic (550/548)
- Fewest points lost : 190 - Ukraine (191/190)
- Highest points ratio : 1.209 - Italy (573/474)
- Lowest points ratio : 0.649 - Algeria (146/225)
- Most points played in match (top 3 ):
  224 - Philippines vs. Iran 2 : 3 (114/110)
  220 - France vs. Argentina 2 : 3 (111/109)
  214 - Italy vs. Belgium 2 : 3 (106/108)
- Fewest points played in match (top 3 ) :
  115 - Ukraine vs. Algeria 3 : 0 (75/40)
  116 - Bulgaria vs. Chile 3 : 0 (75/41)
  121 - France vs. South Korea 3 : 0 (75/46)
- Highest points score in set (excluding 5th set) :
  78 - Germany vs. Bulgaria (38/40)
  66 - Poland vs. Romania (34/32)
  60 - Slovenia vs. Germany (31/29)
- Lowest points score in set (excluding 5th set) :
  35 - Bulgaria vs. Italy (10/25)
  36 - Brazil vs. Czech Republic (25/11)
  36 - Ukraine vs. Algeria (25/11)
  37 - Canada vs. Libya (25/12)
  37 - France vs. South Korea (25/12)
  37 - Ukraine vs. Algeria (25/12)
  37 - Bulgaria vs. Chile (25/12 (2x))
  37 - Japan vs. Libya (25/12)
  37 - Belgium vs. Algeria (25/12)

== Squads ==
=== Teams ===
Total teams : 32
Total players : 448 (14 per team)

=== Coaches ===
- Oldest coach:
  (Italy) Angiolino Frigoni – At 71 years, 179 days of age, at the start of the tournament.
  (Argentina) Raúl Lozano – At 69 years, 9 days of age, at the start of the tournament.
  (Italy) Camillo Placi – At 68 years, 305 days of age, at the start of the tournament.
- Youngest coach:
  (Poland) Michał Winiarski – At 41 years, 349 days of age, at the start of the tournament.
  (Finland) Olli Kunnari – At 43 years, 222 days of age, at the start of the tournament.
  (Italy) Fabio Soli – At 45 years, 349 days of age, at the start of the tournament.

=== Players ===
- Appearance record: Luciano De Cecco Argentina participated in the World Championship for the sixth time.
- Oldest player: At 42 years, 210 days of age, Foad Elmaarug Libya is the oldest player ever to be nominated for a 2025 FIVB Men's Volleyball World Championship finals.
- Youngest player: At 17 years, 57 days of age, Dimitar Dobrev Bulgaria is the youngest player ever to be nominated for a 2025 FIVB Men's Volleyball World Championship finals.
- Tallest player: At 2.15 m (7 ft 05 in), Siebe Korenblek Netherlands is the tallest player ever to be nominated for a 2025 FIVB Men's Volleyball World Championship finals.
- Shortest player: At 1.70 m (5 ft 6 in), Josh Ybañez Philippines is the shortest player ever to be nominated for a 2025 FIVB Men's Volleyball World Championship finals.

=== Multiple World Championships ===
Name	(Japan) 2006	(Italy) 2010	(Poland) 2014	(Italy) (Bulgaria) 2018	(Poland) (Slovenia) 2022	(Philippines) 2025	Total
(Argentina) Luciano De Cecco	✔						6
(France) Earvin N'Gapeth		✔					5
(Tunisia) Ahmed Kadhi		✔					5
(Canada) Nicholas Hoag			✔				4
(Cuba) Robertlandy Simón	✔				✔		4
(France) Benjamin Toniutti			✔				4
(France) Jenia Grebennikov			✔				4
(France) Nicolas Le Goff			✔				4
(Italy) Simone Anzani			✔				4
(Poland) Bartosz Kurek		✔		✔			4
(Serbia) Marko Ivović			✔				4
(Tunisia) Elyes Karamosli			✔				4
(United States) Micah Christenson			✔				4
(Argentina) Agustín Loser				✔			3
(Cuba) Javier Concepción				✔			3
(Cuba) Miguel Ángel López				✔			3
(Cuba) Osniel Melgarejo				✔			3
(Cuba) Yonder García				✔			3
(Egypt) Abdelrahman Seoudy				✔			3
(Egypt) Ahmed Shafik				✔			3
(France) Antoine Brizard				✔			3
(France) Barthélémy Chinenyeze				✔			3
(France) Jean Patry				✔			3
(Iran) Mohammad Reza Hazratpour				✔			3
(Iran) Morteza Sharifi				✔			3
(Italy) Simone Giannelli				✔			3
(Japan) Yūki Ishikawa				✔			3
(Netherlands) Wessel Keemink				✔			3
(Netherlands) Gijs Jorna				✔			3
(Poland) Jakub Kochanowski				✔			3
(Slovenia) Alen Pajenk				✔			3
(Slovenia) Gregor Ropret				✔			3
(Slovenia) Jan Kozamernik				✔			3
(Slovenia) Jani Kovačič				✔			3
(Slovenia) Sašo Štalekar				✔			3
(Slovenia) Tine Urnaut				✔			3
(Slovenia) Tonček Štern				✔			3
(Tunisia) Ali Bongui				✔			3
(United States) Erik Shoji				✔			3
(United States) Jeffrey Jendryk				✔			3
(United States) Taylor Averill				✔			3

== Final standing ==
Pos	Team	Pld	W	L	Pts	SW	SL	SR	SPW	SPL	SPR	Qualification or relegation
1st place, gold medalist(s)	Italy	7	6	1	19	20	4	5.000	573	474	1.209	Champions
2nd place, silver medalist(s)	Bulgaria	7	6	1	16	19	8	2.375	622	554	1.123	Runners up
3rd place, bronze medalist(s)	Poland	7	6	1	18	18	6	3.000	593	503	1.179	Third place
4	Czech Republic	7	4	3	12	14	10	1.400	550	548	1.004	Fourth place
5	United States	5	4	1	13	14	5	2.800	446	391	1.141	Eliminated in quarterfinals
6	Turkey	5	4	1	12	12	5	2.400	408	358	1.140	Eliminated in quarterfinals
7	Belgium	5	4	1	11	12	5	2.400	382	349	1.095	Eliminated in quarterfinals
8	Iran	5	3	2	7	11	11	1.000	496	489	1.014	Eliminated in quarterfinals
9	Argentina	4	3	1	7	9	8	1.125	374	377	0.992	Eliminated in round of 16
10	Serbia	4	2	2	7	8	6	1.333	320	315	1.016	Eliminated in round of 16
11	Slovenia	4	2	2	7	9	7	1.286	353	352	1.003	Eliminated in round of 16
12	Tunisia	4	2	2	6	7	6	1.167	294	285	1.032	Eliminated in round of 16
13	Netherlands	4	2	2	6	8	7	1.143	354	362	0.978	Eliminated in round of 16
14	Canada	4	2	2	6	7	7	1.000	315	324	0.972	Eliminated in round of 16
15	Finland	4	2	2	6	8	9	0.889	363	369	0.984	Eliminated in round of 16
16	Portugal	4	2	2	5	6	9	0.667	317	337	0.941	Eliminated in round of 16
17	Brazil	3	2	1	6	6	4	1.500	233	217	1.074	Eliminated in Preliminary round 3rd place teams
18	France	3	1	2	5	7	6	1.167	291	262	1.111	Eliminated in Preliminary round 3rd place teams
19	Philippines	3	1	2	4	5	7	0.714	269	279	0.964	Eliminated in Preliminary round 3rd place teams
20	Cuba	3	1	2	3	5	6	0.833	249	258	0.965	Eliminated in Preliminary round 3rd place teams
21	Germany	3	1	2	3	4	6	0.667	252	249	1.012	Eliminated in Preliminary round 3rd place teams
22	Qatar	3	1	2	3	4	7	0.571	241	266	0.906	Eliminated in Preliminary round 3rd place teams
23	Japan	3	1	2	3	3	6	0.500	201	199	1.010	Eliminated in Preliminary round 3rd place teams
24	Ukraine	3	1	2	3	3	6	0.500	191	190	1.005	Eliminated in Preliminary round 3rd place teams
25	Egypt	3	1	2	3	4	7	0.571	244	262	0.931	Eliminated in Preliminary round 4th place teams
26	Colombia	3	0	3	1	2	9	0.222	220	259	0.849	Eliminated in Preliminary round 4th place teams
27	South Korea	3	0	3	0	2	9	0.222	219	265	0.826	Eliminated in Preliminary round 4th place teams
28	Libya	3	0	3	0	2	9	0.222	206	274	0.752	Eliminated in Preliminary round 4th place teams
29	Romania	3	0	3	0	1	9	0.111	227	256	0.887	Eliminated in Preliminary round 4th place teams
30	China	3	0	3	0	1	9	0.111	216	249	0.867	Eliminated in Preliminary round 4th place teams
31	Chile	3	0	3	0	0	9	0.000	157	225	0.698	Eliminated in Preliminary round 4th place teams
32	Algeria	3	0	3	0	0	9	0.000	146	225	0.649	Eliminated in Preliminary round 4th place teams

Source: WCH 2025 final standings

== Statistics leaders ==
Statistics leaders correct as of final round.

Best Scorers
	Player	Attacks	Blocks	Serves	Total
1	Aleksandar Nikolov	154	7	12	173
2	Ferre Reggers	93	9	4	106
3	Patrik Indra	93	5	8	106
4	Lukáš Vašina	86	6	6	98
5	Ali Hajipour	80	12	2	94

Best Spikers
	Player	Pts.	Faults	Attacks	%	Total
1	Aleksandar Nikolov	154	40	95	53.29	289
2	Ferre Reggers	93	23	55	54.39	171
3	Patrik Indra	93	26	56	53.14	175
4	Lukáš Vašina	86	20	47	56.21	153
5	Ali Hajipour	80	27	41	54.05	148

Best Blockers
	Player	Blocks	Faults	Rebounds	Avg.	Total
1	Aleks Grozdanov	18	28	32	2.57	78
2	Roberto Russo	16	22	27	2.29	65
3	Jan Kozamernik	15	20	26	3.75	61
4	Martin Atanasov	14	12	9	2.00	35
5	Petteri Tyynismaa	13	23	39	3.25	75

Best Servers
	Player	Aces	Faults	Atp.	Avg.	%
1	Gabriel García	17	18	49	3.40	20.24
2	Yuri Romanò	15	19	58	2.14	16.30
3	Ramazan Efe Mandıracı	13	13	46	2.60	18.06
4	Michiel Ahyi	13	13	35	3.25	21.31
5	Simeon Nikolov	12	22	64	1.71	12.24

Best Setters
	Player	Success	Faults	Atp.	Avg.	%
1	Simeon Nikolov	236	4	322	33.71	41.99
2	Arshia Behnezhad	222	4	197	44.40	52.48
3	Simone Giannelli	200	1	225	28.57	46.95
4	Micah Christenson	191	4	195	38.20	48.97
5	Luboš Bartůněk	180	3	276	25.71	39.22

Best Diggers
	Player	Dig.	Faults	Recep.	Avg.	%
1	Gorik Lantsoght	43	14	18	8.60	57.33
2	Berkay Bayraktar	42	12	23	8.40	54.55
3	Milan Moník	42	19	21	6.00	51.22
4	Fabio Balaso	41	14	20	5.86	54.67
5	Jakub Popiwczak	33	18	30	4.71	40.74

Best Receivers
	Player	Success	Faults	Atp.	Avg.	%
1	Mattia Bottolo	40	8	77	5.71	32.00
2	Lukáš Vašina	38	12	101	5.43	25.17
3	Luka Marttila	37	4	64	9.25	35.24
4	Luciano Palonsky	34	6	86	8.50	26.98
5	Morteza Sharifi	33	11	88	6.60	25.00

== Awards ==
- Most valuable player
  (Italy) Alessandro Michieletto
- Best setter
  (Italy) Simone Giannelli
- Best outside spikers
  (Bulgaria) Aleksandar Nikolov
  (Italy) Alessandro Michieletto
- Best opposite spiker
  (Italy) Yuri Romanò
- Best middle blockers
  (Bulgaria) Aleks Grozdanov
  (Poland) Jakub Kochanowski
- Best libero
  (Italy) Fabio Balaso

== See also ==
- 2022 FIVB Men's Volleyball World Championship statistics
- FIVB Men's Volleyball Nations League statistics
- FIVB Women's Volleyball Nations League statistics
- Volleyball records and statistics
- Major achievements in volleyball by nation
- List of indoor volleyball world medalists
