= 2026 Men's European Volleyball Championship Pool A =

Preliminary round of volleyball championship

Pool A is one of four pools of the preliminary round of the 2026 Men's European Volleyball Championship. The pool consists of Czechia, Greece, co-hosts Italy, Slovakia, Slovenia and Sweden. The opening match was played at the Piazza del Plebiscito in Naples before the rest of the games took place at the PalaPanini, Modena from 10 to 17 September 2026. The top four teams will advance to the final round. The teams progressing were co-hosts Italy, who won all their games, with Slovenia, Greece and Czech Republic advancing with three wins each.

== Teams ==
Team	Qualification method	Date of qualification	Appearance(s)				Previous best performance (Note: Bold text indicates they hosted that edition.)	WR (Note: World ranking at start of tournament.)
Team	Qualification method	Date of qualification	Total	First	Last	Streak	Previous best performance	WR
Slovenia	Top eight in 2023	9 September 2023	11th	2001	2023	10	Runners-up (2015, 2019, 2021)	TBD
Italy (Note: Italy also belatedly qualified as a 2026 host nation.)	Top eight in 2023	9 September 2023	33rd	1948	2023	32	Champions (Seven times) (Note: Italy have won in 1989, 1993, 1995, 1999, 2003, 2005 and 2021.)	TBD
Czechia (Note: Competed as Czechoslovakia from 1949 to 1990.)	Pool C winner	9 August 2025	15th	1995	2023	9	Champions (1948, 1955, 1958)	TBD
Greece	Pool F winner	13 August 2025	18th	1967	2023	4	Third place (1987)	TBD
Slovakia	Pool G winner	13 August 2025	12th	1997	2021	1	Fifth place (2011)	TBD
Sweden	Five best runner-ups	13 August 2025	7th	1971	1993	1	Runners-up (1989)	TBD

== Venue ==
The Piazza del Plebiscito in Naples will host the opening match at the temporary venue at the square. The rest of the group phase will take place in Modena at the PalaPanini, the home for numerous Modena-based clubs.

Naples	2026 Men's European Volleyball Championship Pool A is located in Italy	Modena
Piazza del Plebiscito	2026 Men's European Volleyball Championship Pool A is located in Italy	PalaPanini
Capacity: 6,500	2026 Men's European Volleyball Championship Pool A is located in Italy	Capacity: 4,968

== Group standings ==
Pos	Team	Pld	W	L	Pts	SW	SL	SR	SPW	SPL	SPR	Qualification
1	Italy (H)	5	5	0	14	15	4	3.750	459	380	1.208	Round of 16
2	Slovenia	5	3	2	10	12	7	1.714	447	403	1.109	Round of 16
3	Greece	5	3	2	9	10	9	1.111	430	429	1.002	Round of 16
4	Czechia	5	3	2	8	11	9	1.222	446	448	0.996	Round of 16
5	Sweden	5	1	4	4	6	13	0.462	400	435	0.920	
6	Slovakia	5	0	5	0	3	15	0.200	359	446	0.805	

Source: CEV
(H) Host

=== Group progression ===
The table listed the results of teams in each round.

Win	Loss

Team ╲ Round	1	2	3	4	5
Italy	W	W	W	W	W
Sweden	L	L	L	L	W
Slovenia	W	W	L	W	L
Czechia	W	W	W	L	L
Greece	L	L	W	W	W
Slovakia	L	L	L	L	L

Source: CEV

=== Positions by round ===
The table listed the positions of teams in each round.

Advance to the knockout stage

Team ╲ Round	1	2	3	4	5
Italy	2	1	1	1	1
Sweden	5	4	5	5	5
Slovenia	1	2	3	2	2
Czechia	3	3	2	3	4
Greece	4	5	4	4	3
Slovakia	6	6	6	6	6

Source: CEV

== Matches ==
- All times are Central European Summer Time (UTC+02:00).

=== Italy vs Sweden ===
10 September 2026; 21:05; Match duration: 1hr 54min	Italy	3–0	Sweden	(Italy) Piazza del Plebiscito, Naples; Attendance: 5,914; Referees: Ksenija Jurkovic (CRO), Seçkin Yener (TUR)
10 September 2026; 21:05; Match duration: 1hr 54min	(25–22, 25–21, 25–17); Report			(Italy) Piazza del Plebiscito, Naples; Attendance: 5,914; Referees: Ksenija Jurkovic (CRO), Seçkin Yener (TUR)
10 September 2026; 21:05; Match duration: 1hr 54min	Scoring leaders			(Italy) Piazza del Plebiscito, Naples; Attendance: 5,914; Referees: Ksenija Jurkovic (CRO), Seçkin Yener (TUR)
Romanò 13		Total	Enlund 9
Romanò (11/21)		Attack	Enlund, Link 8
Galassi 2		Block	'Four players' 1
Romanò, Sanguinetti 2		Serve	Ekstrand (2/12)

=== Czechia vs Greece ===
11 September 2026; 16:00; Match duration: 1hr 51min	Czechia	3–1	Greece	(Italy) PalaPanini, Modena; Attendance: 280; Referees: Atanas Varbanov (BUL), Jörg Kellenberger (GER)
11 September 2026; 16:00; Match duration: 1hr 51min	(25–21, 25–17, 23–25, 25–23); Report			(Italy) PalaPanini, Modena; Attendance: 280; Referees: Atanas Varbanov (BUL), Jörg Kellenberger (GER)
11 September 2026; 16:00; Match duration: 1hr 51min	Scoring leaders			(Italy) PalaPanini, Modena; Attendance: 280; Referees: Atanas Varbanov (BUL), Jörg Kellenberger (GER)
Šotola 18		Total	Raptis 16
Šotola (15/26)		Attack	Raptis (15/26)
Šotola 3		Block	Pitakoudis 2
Drahoňovský (3/13)		Serve	Galiotos (2/15)

=== Slovakia vs Slovenia ===
11 September 2026; 21:00; Match duration: 1hr 27min	Slovakia	0–3	Slovenia	(Italy) PalaPanini, Modena; Attendance: 459; Referees: Koen Luts (BEL), Ksenija Jurkovic (CRO)
11 September 2026; 21:00; Match duration: 1hr 27min	(29–31, 15–25, 18–25); Report			(Italy) PalaPanini, Modena; Attendance: 459; Referees: Koen Luts (BEL), Ksenija Jurkovic (CRO)
11 September 2026; 21:00; Match duration: 1hr 27min	Scoring leaders			(Italy) PalaPanini, Modena; Attendance: 459; Referees: Koen Luts (BEL), Ksenija Jurkovic (CRO)
Firkaľ 12		Total	Mujanović 14
Firkaľ (11/22)		Attack	Možič (10/19)
Ihnát 2		Block	Kozamernik 3
Matejčík (2/7)		Serve	Mujanović (4/15)

=== Sweden vs Czechia ===
12 September 2026; 16:00; Match duration: 2hr 18min	Sweden	2−3	Czechia	(Italy) PalaPanini, Modena; Attendance: 797; Referees: Seçkin Yener (TUR), Atanas Varbanov (BUL)
12 September 2026; 16:00; Match duration: 2hr 18min	(22−25, 23−25, 25−23, 25−17, 13−15); Report			(Italy) PalaPanini, Modena; Attendance: 797; Referees: Seçkin Yener (TUR), Atanas Varbanov (BUL)
12 September 2026; 16:00; Match duration: 2hr 18min	Scoring leaders			(Italy) PalaPanini, Modena; Attendance: 797; Referees: Seçkin Yener (TUR), Atanas Varbanov (BUL)
Enlund 23		Total	Vašina 19
Enlund (20/47)		Attack	Vašina (19/47)
Ekman 4		Block	Klajmon 4
Link (2/13)		Serve	Klimeš (2/21)

=== Greece vs Italy ===
12 September 2026; 21:05; Match duration: 1hr 38min	Greece	0−3	Italy	(Italy) PalaPanini, Modena; Attendance: 4,200; Referees: Jörg Kellenberger (GER), Koen Luts (BEL)
12 September 2026; 21:05; Match duration: 1hr 38min	(23−25, 23−25, 16−25); Report			(Italy) PalaPanini, Modena; Attendance: 4,200; Referees: Jörg Kellenberger (GER), Koen Luts (BEL)
12 September 2026; 21:05; Match duration: 1hr 38min	Scoring leaders			(Italy) PalaPanini, Modena; Attendance: 4,200; Referees: Jörg Kellenberger (GER), Koen Luts (BEL)
Raptis 12		Total	Lavia 15
Raptis (12/27)		Attack	Romanò (14/24)
Voulkidis 2		Block	Galassi, Sanguinetti 2
		Serve	Giannelli, Lavia 1

=== Slovenia vs Sweden ===
13 September 2026; 16:00; Match duration: 1hr 15min	Slovenia	3–0	Sweden	(Italy) PalaPanini, Modena; Attendance: 850; Referees: Ksenija Jurkovic (CRO), Jörg Kellenberger (GER)
13 September 2026; 16:00; Match duration: 1hr 15min	(25–16, 25–21, 25–12); Report			(Italy) PalaPanini, Modena; Attendance: 850; Referees: Ksenija Jurkovic (CRO), Jörg Kellenberger (GER)
13 September 2026; 16:00; Match duration: 1hr 15min	Scoring leaders			(Italy) PalaPanini, Modena; Attendance: 850; Referees: Ksenija Jurkovic (CRO), Jörg Kellenberger (GER)
Mujanović 17		Total	Enlund 12
Mujanović (14/24)		Attack	Enlund (10/23)
'Six players' 1		Block	Ekman, Ekstrand 2
Mujanović, Najdič 2		Serve	Enlund (1/6)

=== Italy vs Slovakia ===
13 September 2026; 21:05; Match duration: 1hr 57min	Italy	3–1	Slovakia	(Italy) PalaPanini, Modena; Attendance: 4,392; Referees: Atanas Varbanov (BUL), Seçkin Yener (TUR)
13 September 2026; 21:05; Match duration: 1hr 57min	(25–17, 25–27, 25–10, 25–19); Report			(Italy) PalaPanini, Modena; Attendance: 4,392; Referees: Atanas Varbanov (BUL), Seçkin Yener (TUR)
13 September 2026; 21:05; Match duration: 1hr 57min	Scoring leaders			(Italy) PalaPanini, Modena; Attendance: 4,392; Referees: Atanas Varbanov (BUL), Seçkin Yener (TUR)
Mati 22		Total	Gulák, Ihnát 12
Romanò (15/21)		Attack	Ihnát (12/16)
Mati 6		Block	Palgut 2
'Four players' 1		Serve	'Three players' 1

=== Slovakia vs Czechia ===
14 September 2026; 16:00; Match duration: 1hr 19min	Slovakia	0−3	Czechia	(Italy) PalaPanini, Modena; Attendance: 414; Referees: Seçkin Yener (TUR), Ksenija Jurkovic (CRO)
14 September 2026; 16:00; Match duration: 1hr 19min	(21−25, 14−25, 20−25); Report			(Italy) PalaPanini, Modena; Attendance: 414; Referees: Seçkin Yener (TUR), Ksenija Jurkovic (CRO)
14 September 2026; 16:00; Match duration: 1hr 19min	Scoring leaders			(Italy) PalaPanini, Modena; Attendance: 414; Referees: Seçkin Yener (TUR), Ksenija Jurkovic (CRO)
Gulák 13		Total	Indra 18
Gulák (13/20)		Attack	Indra (16/19)
Sellong 1		Block	Klajmon, Klimeš 2
Ihnát (2/12)		Serve	Klimeš (3/15)

=== Slovenia vs Greece ===
14 September 2026; 21:00; Match duration: 1hr 57min	Slovenia	1−3	Greece	(Italy) PalaPanini, Modena; Attendance: 511; Referees: Koen Luts (BEL), Atanas Varbanov (BUL)
14 September 2026; 21:00; Match duration: 1hr 57min	(18−25, 25−19, 23−25, 20−25); Report			(Italy) PalaPanini, Modena; Attendance: 511; Referees: Koen Luts (BEL), Atanas Varbanov (BUL)
14 September 2026; 21:00; Match duration: 1hr 57min	Scoring leaders			(Italy) PalaPanini, Modena; Attendance: 511; Referees: Koen Luts (BEL), Atanas Varbanov (BUL)
Mujanović 20		Total	Mouchlias 12
Mujanović (18/39)		Attack	Raptis (10/35)
Kozamernik 6		Block	Voulkidis 2
Možič (2/17)		Serve	Mouchlias, Protopsaltis 1

=== Greece vs Sweden ===
15 September 2026; 16:00; Match duration: 2hr 01min	Greece	3−1	Sweden	(Italy) PalaPanini, Modena; Attendance: 398; Referees: Jörg Kellenberger (GER), Seçkin Yener (TUR)
15 September 2026; 16:00; Match duration: 2hr 01min	(25−23, 25−21, 17−25, 25−20); Report			(Italy) PalaPanini, Modena; Attendance: 398; Referees: Jörg Kellenberger (GER), Seçkin Yener (TUR)
15 September 2026; 16:00; Match duration: 2hr 01min	Scoring leaders			(Italy) PalaPanini, Modena; Attendance: 398; Referees: Jörg Kellenberger (GER), Seçkin Yener (TUR)
Mouchlias 20		Total	Enlund 24
Mouchlias (18/34)		Attack	Enlund (20/45)
Mouchlias 2		Block	Enlund, Johansson 4
Pitakoudis, Markou 2		Serve	Link, Ekstrand 1

=== Czechia vs Italy ===
15 September 2026; 21:05; Match duration: 1hr 47min	Czechia	1–3	Italy	(Italy) PalaPanini, Modena; Attendance: 4,487; Referees: Ksenija Jurkovic (CRO), Atanas Varbanov (BUL)
15 September 2026; 21:05; Match duration: 1hr 47min	(25–23, 16–25, 20–25, 20–25); Report			(Italy) PalaPanini, Modena; Attendance: 4,487; Referees: Ksenija Jurkovic (CRO), Atanas Varbanov (BUL)
15 September 2026; 21:05; Match duration: 1hr 47min	Scoring leaders			(Italy) PalaPanini, Modena; Attendance: 4,487; Referees: Ksenija Jurkovic (CRO), Atanas Varbanov (BUL)
Indra, Vašina 12		Total	Romanò 24
Indra (12/18)		Attack	Bottolo (18/25)
'Three players' 1		Block	Mati 3
Drahoňovský (2/11)		Serve	Romanò (5/18)

=== Sweden vs Slovakia ===
16 September 2026; 16:00; Match duration: 1hr 46min	Sweden	3–1	Slovakia	(Italy) PalaPanini, Modena; Attendance: 351; Referees: Koen Luts (BEL), Atanas Varbanov (BUL)
16 September 2026; 16:00; Match duration: 1hr 46min	(19–25, 25–23, 25–21, 25–19); Report			(Italy) PalaPanini, Modena; Attendance: 351; Referees: Koen Luts (BEL), Atanas Varbanov (BUL)
16 September 2026; 16:00; Match duration: 1hr 46min	Scoring leaders			(Italy) PalaPanini, Modena; Attendance: 351; Referees: Koen Luts (BEL), Atanas Varbanov (BUL)
Link 16		Total	Gulák 19
Link (15/28)		Attack	Ihnát (14/27)
Ekman 3		Block	Sellong 3
Algulin, Enlund 1		Serve	Gulák (4/15)

=== Czechia vs Slovenia ===
16 September 2026; 21:00; Match duration: 1hr 55min	Czechia	1–3	Slovenia	(Italy) PalaPanini, Modena; Attendance: 630; Referees: Seçkin Yener (TUR), Jörg Kellenberger (GER)
16 September 2026; 21:00; Match duration: 1hr 55min	(26–24, 13–25, 25–27, 23–25); Report			(Italy) PalaPanini, Modena; Attendance: 630; Referees: Seçkin Yener (TUR), Jörg Kellenberger (GER)
16 September 2026; 21:00; Match duration: 1hr 55min	Scoring leaders			(Italy) PalaPanini, Modena; Attendance: 630; Referees: Seçkin Yener (TUR), Jörg Kellenberger (GER)
Indra 16		Total	Mujanović 21
Indra (15/32)		Attack	Mujanović (16/33)
Benda, Klimeš 2		Block	Kozamernik, Mujanović 3
Klimeš ,Vašina 2		Serve	Mujanović (2/16)

=== Slovakia vs Greece ===
17 September 2026; 16:00; Match duration: 1hr 52min	Slovakia	1–3	Greece	(Italy) PalaPanini, Modena; Attendance: 275; Referees: Ksenija Jurkovic (CRO), Jörg Kellenberger (GER)
17 September 2026; 16:00; Match duration: 1hr 52min	(17–25, 25–21, 22–25, 17–25); Report			(Italy) PalaPanini, Modena; Attendance: 275; Referees: Ksenija Jurkovic (CRO), Jörg Kellenberger (GER)
17 September 2026; 16:00; Match duration: 1hr 52min	Scoring leaders			(Italy) PalaPanini, Modena; Attendance: 275; Referees: Ksenija Jurkovic (CRO), Jörg Kellenberger (GER)
Firkaľ, Gulák 14		Total	Markou 21
Gulák (13/29)		Attack	Markou (20/29)
Billich, Hanúsek 2		Block	Pitakoudis, Voulkidis 3
Hanúsek (2/13)		Serve	'Three players' 1

=== Italy vs Slovenia ===
17 September 2026; 21:05; Match duration: 2hr 18min	Italy	3–2	Slovenia	(Italy) PalaPanini, Modena; Attendance: 4,798; Referees: Atanas Varbanov (BUL), Koen Luts (BEL)
17 September 2026; 21:05; Match duration: 2hr 18min	(25–19, 25–22, 27–29, 19–25, 15–9) [ Report]			(Italy) PalaPanini, Modena; Attendance: 4,798; Referees: Atanas Varbanov (BUL), Koen Luts (BEL)
