= 2025 FIVB Men's Volleyball World Championship =

Volleyball tournament in the Philippines

Tournament details
- Host country: Philippines
- Cities: Pasay (Note: For promotional purposes the host city of the tournament is designated as "Manila". The two competition venues within Metro Manila are outside the City of Manila.); Quezon City
- Dates: 12–28 September
- Teams: 32 (from 5 confederations)
- Venue: 2 (in 2 host cities)
- Officially opened by: Bongbong Marcos

Final positions
- Champions: Italy (5th title)
- Runners-up: Bulgaria
- Third place: Poland
- Fourth place: Czech Republic

Tournament awards
- MVP: (Italy) Alessandro Michieletto
- Best Setter: (Italy) Simone Giannelli
- Best OH: (Bulgaria) Aleksandar Nikolov (Italy) Alessandro Michieletto
- Best MB: (Bulgaria) Aleks Grozdanov (Poland) Jakub Kochanowski
- Best OPP: (Italy) Yuri Romanò
- Best Libero: (Italy) Fabio Balaso

Tournament statistics
- Matches played: 64
- Attendance: 216,930 (3,390 per match)

The 2025 FIVB Men's Volleyball World Championship was the 21st staging of the FIVB Men's Volleyball World Championship, contested by the senior men's national teams of the members of the Fédération Internationale de Volleyball (FIVB). It took place in two cities of the Philippines from 12 to 28 September 2025, and the first edition under the two-year cycles in odd-numbered years with an expanded format featuring 32 teams.

The tournament was the first World Championship hosted in Southeast Asia, and the second of two consecutive World Championships in 2025 held in this region, following the Women's World Championship in Thailand. The Philippines became the second country in Asia to host the World Championship, following Japan. The competition was also the second world senior championship in Olympic team sports to be hosted in the Philippines. Italy were the defending champions, having won their fourth title in 2022, and remains as the reigning world champions after winning the 2025 Championship on 28 September 2025. With the win, Italy equaled a record previously held only by the USSR by becoming world volleyball champions in both the men’s and women’s competitions — the Soviet Union achieved the feat in 1952 and 1960.

== Background ==
Previously, the competition format was determined through agreements between the host country and the FIVB, resulting in varying and inconsistent formats. In March 2022, the FIVB Board of Administration approved the new proposed World Championship format. To standardize, the proposed format started with a pool phase and then proceeded with a direct elimination phase. Additionally, they proposed increasing the number of teams from 24 to 32 to guarantee universality. The new format of the World Championship was confirmed in late 2022 and started with this edition.

In May 2022, the FIVB revealed the television rights agreement for Polsat covering the competition events from 2022 to 2032, which included a new event to be held in 2025 and 2029. Before that, Fabio Azevedo, now the FIVB president and a member of the Board of Administration, suggested that the World Championships be held in 2027 and subsequently every two years, while the Continental Championships would take place in 2026 and 2028, serving as qualifiers for the World Championships. However, the proposed timeline was moved up after the FIVB announced the competition calendar for 2025 to 2028 in June 2023, shifting the World Championships to 2025 and using the 2023 Continental Championships as qualifiers for that event.

== Host selection ==
The bidding procedure to host the 2025 and 2027 FIVB World Championships began in August 2023. National federations had until 31 August 2023 to register interest. Around 31 countries expressed interest to host the tournament. This figure was reduced to three final candidates: Indonesia, Japan and the Philippines. On 20 March 2024, FIVB announced that the Philippines was selected to host the tournament.

== Qualification ==
The host country Philippines qualified for the competition as well as the defending champions Italy. The top three teams from each of the 2023 Continental Championships secured qualification. The final 15 places belonged to top 15 teams as per FIVB World Ranking who had not yet qualified.

Country	Confederation	Method of qualification	Date of qualification	Appearance(s)			Previous best performance
Country	Confederation	Method of qualification	Date of qualification	Total	First	Last	Previous best performance
Philippines	AVC	Hosts	20 March 2024	1	Debut		—N/a
Italy	CEV	Defending champions	11 September 2022	19	1949	2022	Champions (1990, 1994, 1998, 2022)
Japan	AVC	2023 Asian champions	25 August 2023	17	1960	2022	3rd place (1970, 1974)
Iran	AVC	2023 Asian runners-up	25 August 2023	8	1970	2022	6th place (2014)
Qatar	AVC	2023 Asian 3rd placers	26 August 2023	2	2022	2022	21st place (2022)
Brazil	CSV	2023 South American runners-up	28 August 2023	19	1956	2022	Champions (2002, 2006, 2010)
Argentina	CSV	2023 South American champions	29 August 2023	14	1960	2022	3rd place (1982)
Colombia	CSV	2023 South American 3rd placers	29 August 2023	1	Debut		—N/a
United States	NORCECA	2023 NORCECA champions	9 September 2023	18	1956	2022	Champions (1986)
Canada	NORCECA	2023 NORCECA runners-up	9 September 2023	13	1974	2022	7th place (2014)
Cuba	NORCECA	2023 NORCECA 3rd placers	10 September 2023	17	1956	2022	Runners-up (1990, 2010)
Egypt	CAVB	2023 African champions	11 September 2023	11	1974	2022	13th place (2010)
Algeria	CAVB	2023 African runners-up	11 September 2023	3	1994	1998	13th place (1994)
Poland	CEV	2023 European champions	12 September 2023	19	1949	2022	Champions (1974, 2014, 2018)
Slovenia	CEV	2023 European 3rd placers	12 September 2023	3	2018	2022	4th place (2022)
France	CEV	2023 European 4th placers^{a}	12 September 2023	18	1949	2022	3rd place (2002)
Libya	CAVB	2023 African 3rd placers	13 September 2023	2	1982	1982	24th place (1982)
Germany	CEV	1st World ranked non-qualified team	30 August 2024	13^{b}	1956	2022	Champions (1970)
Serbia	CEV	2nd World ranked non-qualified team	30 August 2024	12^{c}	1956	2022	Runners-up (1998)
Netherlands	CEV	3rd World ranked non-qualified team	30 August 2024	14	1949	2022	Runners-up (1994)
Ukraine	CEV	4th World ranked non-qualified team	30 August 2024	3	1998	2022	7th place (2022)
Belgium	CEV	5th World ranked non-qualified team	30 August 2024	10	1949	2018	8th place (1970)
Turkey	CEV	6th World ranked non-qualified team	30 August 2024	5	1956	2022	11th place (2022)
Czech Republic	CEV	7th World ranked non-qualified team	30 August 2024	17^{d}	1949	2010	Champions (1956, 1966)
Bulgaria	CEV	8th World ranked non-qualified team	30 August 2024	20	1949	2022	Runners-up (1970)
Portugal	CEV	9th World ranked non-qualified team	30 August 2024	3	1956	2002	8th place (2002)
Finland	CEV	10th World ranked non-qualified team	30 August 2024	9	1952	2018	9th place (2014)
Tunisia	CAVB	11th World ranked non-qualified team	30 August 2024	12	1962	2022	15th place (2006)
China	AVC	12th World ranked non-qualified team	30 August 2024	16	1956	2022	7th place (1978, 1982)
Romania	CEV	13th World ranked non-qualified team	30 August 2024	11	1949	1982	Runners-up (1956, 1966)
Chile	CSV	14th World ranked non-qualified team	30 August 2024	2	1982	1982	23rd place (1982)
South Korea	AVC	15th World ranked non-qualified team	30 August 2024	10	1956	2014	4th place (1978)

Notes
^{a} France, 4th placers of the tournament qualified since Italy, the runners-up of this tournament were the defending world champions.
^{b} Competed as East Germany from 1956 to 1990 (7 times) and as West Germany from 1956 to 1990 (8 times); 5 appearances as Germany.
^{c} Competed as SFR Yugoslavia from 1956 to 1970 (4 times) and as Serbia and Montenegro from 1998 to 2006 (3 times); 4 appearances as Serbia.
^{d} Competed as Czechoslovakia from 1949 to 1990; 5 appearances as Czech Republic.

== Format ==
The tournament is played in two rounds: a preliminary round (pool phase) and a final round (direct elimination phase). During the preliminary round, 32 qualified teams were divided into eight pools, labeled A through H, with four teams in each pool. In this phase, every team within a pool competed against the other three teams once. After the pool phase, the top two teams from each pool will advanced to the final round, creating a round of 16 teams. Simultaneously, the bottom two teams from each pool will be ranked from 17th to 32nd based on the Team Combined Ranking System.

The final round follows a single-elimination format with the round of 16 match-ups determined by each team's pool and ranking position. The initial pairings—A1 versus H2, H1 versus A2, D1 versus E2, E1 versus D2, B1 versus G2, G1 versus B2, C1 versus F2, and F1 versus B2—ensured that teams from pools A, D, E, and H will not encounter with teams from pools B, C, F, and G until the final match. As the competition progresses, the round of 16 losers will be ranked from 9th to 16th according to the Team Combined Ranking System, while the winners will advance to the quarterfinals. The quarterfinals followed a similar pattern, with losing teams will rank from 5th to 8th, and victorious teams will moving to the next stage of the competition. In the semifinals, the losers will compete for the third place, while the winners will face each other in the final match.

== Pools composition ==
The 32 teams were distributed to eight pools of four teams. The draw of lots took place at Solaire Hotel in Parañaque on 14 September 2024. Rankings of teams are shown in brackets.

The host and the top seven teams are automatically seeded as the first teams of the eight pools.

Seeded teams	Pot 1	Pot 2	Pot 3
Philippines (61) (Hosts); Poland (1); France (2); United States (3); Slovenia (4); Italy (5); Japan (6); Brazil (7)	Germany (8); Argentina (9); Serbia (10); Canada (11); Cuba (12); Netherlands (13); Iran (14); Ukraine (15)	Belgium (16); Turkey (17); Czech Republic (18); Bulgaria (19); Egypt (20); Qatar (21); Portugal (22); Finland (23)	Tunisia (24); China (25); Romania (26); Chile (27); South Korea (28); Libya (44); Colombia (45); Algeria (50)

Draw

Pool A	Pool B	Pool C	Pool D
Philippines	Poland	France	United States
Iran	Netherlands	Argentina	Cuba
Egypt	Qatar	Finland	Portugal
Tunisia	Romania	South Korea	Colombia
Pool E	Pool F	Pool G	Pool H
Slovenia	Italy	Japan	Brazil
Germany	Ukraine	Canada	Serbia
Bulgaria	Belgium	Turkey	Czech Republic
Chile	Algeria	Libya	China

== Team ranking system ==
=== Pool standing procedure ===
To establish the ranking of the teams after the preliminary round, the following criteria were implemented:

1. Total number of victories (matches won, matches lost)
2. In the event of a tie, the teams will be ranked by the most point gained per match as follows:
  - Match won 3–0 or 3–1: 3 points for the winner, 0 points for the loser
  - Match won 3–2: 2 points for the winner, 1 point for the loser
  - Match forfeited: 3 points for the winner, 0 points (0–25, 0–25, 0–25) for the loser
3. If teams are still tied after examining the number of victories and points gained, then the FIVB will examine the results in order to break the tie in the following order:
  - Set quotient: if two or more teams are tied on the number of points gained, they will be ranked by the quotient resulting from the division of the number of all set won by the number of all sets lost.
  - Points quotient: if the tie persists based on the set quotient, the teams will be ranked by the quotient resulting from the division of all points scored by the total of points lost during all sets.
  - If the tie persists based on the point quotient, the tie will be broken based on the team that won the match of the Round Robin Phase between the tied teams. When the tie in point quotient is between three or more teams, these teams ranked taking into consideration only the matches involving the teams in question.

=== Teams combined ranking system ===
To establish the final ranking of the teams, the following criteria were implemented:

1. Position of the team in the Pool (1st, 2nd, 3rd and 4th)
2. Total number of victories (matches won, matches lost)
3. In the event of a tie, the teams will be ranked by the most point gained per match as follows:
  - Match won 3–0 or 3–1: 3 points for the winner, 0 points for the loser
  - Match won 3–2: 2 points for the winner, 1 point for the loser
  - Match forfeited: 3 points for the winner, 0 points (0–25, 0–25, 0–25) for the loser
4. If teams are still tied after examining the number of victories and points gained, then the FIVB will examine the results in order to break the tie in the following order:
  - Set quotient: if two or more teams are tied on the number of points gained, they will be ranked by the quotient resulting from the division of the number of all set won by the number of all sets lost.
  - Points quotient: if the tie persists based on the set quotient, the teams will be ranked by the quotient resulting from the division of all points scored by the total of points lost during all sets.
  - If the tie persists based on the point quotient, the tie will be broken based on the team that won the match of the Round Robin Phase between the tied teams. When the tie in point quotient is between three or more teams, these teams ranked taking into consideration only the matches involving the teams in question.

After the round of 16 and the quarterfinals, the eliminated teams were ranked in the final standings according to the Teams Combined Ranking System, which takes into account all matches played during both the preliminary and final rounds.

== Squads ==
Each national team had to register a long-list roster with up to 25 players, which eventually had to be reduced to a final list of 14 players.

== Venues ==
Host venues of the FIVB Men's Volleyball World Championship in the Greater Manila Area
- 1 Pasay
- 2 Quezon City

The tournament will have two venues in two cities in Metro Manila. Both the SM Mall of Asia Arena in Pasay and the Araneta Coliseum in Quezon City were the first two confirmed locations for the championship. There were possibilities for the finals to be held at the Mall of Asia Arena due to its capacity and the technical reasons. Other host cities would be confirmed later. The former was confirmed to be the venue for the final round matches.

Additionally the Philsports Arena in Pasig, the Filoil EcoOil Centre in San Juan, and the Ninoy Aquino Stadium and Rizal Memorial Coliseum within the Rizal Memorial Sports Complex in Manila are named as official training venues for the participating teams.

Preliminary and final rounds	Preliminary round
Pasay	Quezon City
SM Mall of Asia Arena	Araneta Coliseum
Capacity: 20,000	Capacity: 14,429

== Preliminary round ==
- All times are Philippine Standard Time (UTC+08:00).

=== Pool A ===
- Venue: SM Mall of Asia Arena

Pos	Team	Pld	W	L	Pts	SW	SL	SR	SPW	SPL	SPR	Qualification
1	Tunisia	3	2	1	6	7	3	2.333	234	210	1.114	Final round
2	Iran	3	2	1	5	7	6	1.167	293	289	1.014	Final round
3	Philippines (H)	3	1	2	4	5	7	0.714	269	279	0.964	
4	Egypt	3	1	2	3	4	7	0.571	244	262	0.931	

Source: FIVB Men's World Championship - Standings
(H) Host

Date	Time		Score		Set 1	Set 2	Set 3	Set 4	Set 5	Total	Attd	Report
12 Sep	19:00	Philippines	0–3	Tunisia	13–25	17–25	23–25			53–75	9,245	P2 Report
14 Sep	13:30	Iran	1–3	Egypt	17–25	25–16	23–25	20–25		85–91	2,469	P2 Report
16 Sep	13:30	Iran	3–1	Tunisia	23–25	25–20	25–23	25–16		98–84	1,340	P2 Report
16 Sep	17:30	Philippines	3–1	Egypt	29–27	23–25	25–21	25–21		102–94	6,043	P2 Report
18 Sep	13:30	Egypt	0–3	Tunisia	19–25	18–25	22–25			59–75	988	P2 Report
18 Sep	17:30	Philippines	2–3	Iran	25–21	21–25	25–17	23–25	20–22	114–110	14,240	P2 Report

=== Pool B ===
- Venue: Araneta Coliseum

Pos	Team	Pld	W	L	Pts	SW	SL	SR	SPW	SPL	SPR	Qualification
1	Poland	3	3	0	9	9	1	9.000	256	209	1.225	Final round
2	Netherlands	3	2	1	6	7	4	1.750	267	260	1.027	Final round
3	Qatar	3	1	2	3	4	7	0.571	241	266	0.906	
4	Romania	3	0	3	0	1	9	0.111	227	256	0.887	

Source: FIVB Men's World Championship - Standings

Date	Time		Score		Set 1	Set 2	Set 3	Set 4	Set 5	Total	Attd	Report
13 Sep	18:00	Netherlands	3–1	Qatar	25–18	25–23	26–28	25–23		101–92	2,974	P2 Report
13 Sep	21:30	Poland	3–0	Romania	34–32	25–15	25–19			84–66	1,785	P2 Report
15 Sep	18:00	Netherlands	3–0	Romania	25–23	26–24	26–24			77–71	896	P2 Report
15 Sep	21:30	Poland	3–0	Qatar	25–21	25–14	25–19			75–54	1,208	P2 Report
17 Sep	10:30	Qatar	3–1	Romania	20–25	25–23	25–20	25–22		95–90	312	P2 Report
17 Sep	18:00	Poland	3–1	Netherlands	22–25	25–23	25–19	25–22		97–89	3,399	P2 Report

=== Pool C ===
- Venue: Araneta Coliseum

Pos	Team	Pld	W	L	Pts	SW	SL	SR	SPW	SPL	SPR	Qualification
1	Argentina	3	3	0	7	9	5	1.800	309	302	1.023	Final round
2	Finland	3	2	1	6	8	6	1.333	304	294	1.034	Final round
3	France	3	1	2	5	7	6	1.167	291	262	1.111	
4	South Korea	3	0	3	0	2	9	0.222	219	265	0.826	

Source: FIVB Men's World Championship - Standings

Date	Time		Score		Set 1	Set 2	Set 3	Set 4	Set 5	Total	Attd	Report
14 Sep	10:30	Argentina	3–2	Finland	19–25	18–25	25–22	25–22	15–11	102–105	982	P2 Report
14 Sep	18:00	France	3–0	South Korea	25–12	25–18	25–16			75–46	1,050	P2 Report
16 Sep	10:30	Argentina	3–1	South Korea	25–22	23–25	25–21	25–18		98–86	502	P2 Report
16 Sep	18:00	France	2–3	Finland	19–25	25–17	27–29	25–21	9–15	105–107	700	P2 Report
18 Sep	10:30	Finland	3–1	South Korea	25–18	25–23	17–25	25–21		92–87	512	P2 Report
18 Sep	18:00	France	2–3	Argentina	26–28	23–25	25–21	25–20	12–15	111–109	1,820	P2 Report

=== Pool D ===
- Venue: SM Mall of Asia Arena

Pos	Team	Pld	W	L	Pts	SW	SL	SR	SPW	SPL	SPR	Qualification
1	United States	3	3	0	9	9	1	9.000	250	202	1.238	Final round
2	Portugal	3	2	1	5	6	6	1.000	262	262	1.000	Final round
3	Cuba	3	1	2	3	5	6	0.833	249	258	0.965	
4	Colombia	3	0	3	1	2	9	0.222	220	259	0.849	

Source: FIVB Men's World Championship - Standings

Date	Time		Score		Set 1	Set 2	Set 3	Set 4	Set 5	Total	Attd	Report
13 Sep	10:00	United States	3–0	Colombia	25–20	25–21	25–14			75–55	2,743	P2 Report
13 Sep	13:30	Cuba	1–3	Portugal	25–20	22–25	19–25	19–25		85–95	2,900	P2 Report
15 Sep	10:00	Cuba	3–0	Colombia	25–22	25–21	25–20			75–63	1,154	P2 Report
15 Sep	21:00	United States	3–0	Portugal	25–19	25–22	25–17			75–58	3,663	P2 Report
17 Sep	10:00	Portugal	3–2	Colombia	23–25	21–25	25–20	25–21	15–11	109–102	570	P2 Report
17 Sep	17:30	United States	3–1	Cuba	25–17	25–22	23–25	27–25		100–89	2,382	P2 Report

=== Pool E ===
- Venue: SM Mall of Asia Arena

Pos	Team	Pld	W	L	Pts	SW	SL	SR	SPW	SPL	SPR	Qualification
1	Bulgaria	3	3	0	8	9	2	4.500	271	217	1.249	Final round
2	Slovenia	3	2	1	7	8	4	2.000	269	258	1.043	Final round
3	Germany	3	1	2	3	4	6	0.667	252	249	1.012	
4	Chile	3	0	3	0	0	9	0.000	157	225	0.698	

Source: FIVB Men's World Championship - Standings

Date	Time		Score		Set 1	Set 2	Set 3	Set 4	Set 5	Total	Attd	Report
13 Sep	17:30	Germany	0–3	Bulgaria	38–40	22–25	20–25			80–90	3,123	P2 Report
13 Sep	21:00	Slovenia	3–0	Chile	25–19	25–20	25–16			75–55	3,255	P2 Report
15 Sep	13:30	Germany	3–0	Chile	25–17	25–23	25–21			75–61	2,270	P2 Report
15 Sep	17:30	Slovenia	2–3	Bulgaria	19–25	14–25	25–18	25–23	13–15	96–106	3,311	P2 Report
17 Sep	13:30	Bulgaria	3–0	Chile	25–17	25–12	25–12			75–41	1,033	P2 Report
17 Sep	21:00	Slovenia	3–1	Germany	25–21	17–25	31–29	25–22		98–97	2,969	P2 Report

=== Pool F ===
- Venue: Araneta Coliseum

Pos	Team	Pld	W	L	Pts	SW	SL	SR	SPW	SPL	SPR	Qualification
1	Belgium	3	3	0	8	9	2	4.500	258	215	1.200	Final round
2	Italy	3	2	1	7	8	3	2.667	256	221	1.158	Final round
3	Ukraine	3	1	2	3	3	6	0.500	191	190	1.005	
4	Algeria	3	0	3	0	0	9	0.000	146	225	0.649	

Source: FIVB Men's World Championship - Standings

Date	Time		Score		Set 1	Set 2	Set 3	Set 4	Set 5	Total	Attd	Report
14 Sep	14:00	Ukraine	0–3	Belgium	16–25	17–25	22–25			55–75	1,053	P2 Report
14 Sep	21:30	Italy	3–0	Algeria	25–13	25–22	25–17			75–52	1,750	P2 Report
16 Sep	14:00	Ukraine	3–0	Algeria	25–17	25–12	25–11			75–40	422	P2 Report
16 Sep	21:30	Italy	2–3	Belgium	23–25	20–25	25–22	25–21	13–15	106–108	1,319	P2 Report
18 Sep	14:00	Belgium	3–0	Algeria	25–22	25–20	25–12			75–54	514	P2 Report
18 Sep	21:30	Italy	3–0	Ukraine	25–21	25–22	25–18			75–61	2,206	P2 Report

=== Pool G ===
- Venue: Araneta Coliseum

Pos	Team	Pld	W	L	Pts	SW	SL	SR	SPW	SPL	SPR	Qualification
1	Turkey	3	3	0	9	9	1	9.000	250	196	1.276	Final round
2	Canada	3	2	1	6	6	4	1.500	238	226	1.053	Final round
3	Japan	3	1	2	3	3	6	0.500	201	199	1.010	
4	Libya	3	0	3	0	2	9	0.222	206	274	0.752	

Source: FIVB Men's World Championship - Standings

Date	Time		Score		Set 1	Set 2	Set 3	Set 4	Set 5	Total	Attd	Report
13 Sep	10:30	Canada	3–1	Libya	22–25	25–20	25–12	29–27		101–84	2,820	P2 Report
13 Sep	14:00	Japan	0–3	Turkey	19–25	23–25	19–25			61–75	7,518	P2 Report
15 Sep	10:30	Turkey	3–1	Libya	25–18	23–25	25–14	25–16		98–73	1,524	P2 Report
15 Sep	14:00	Japan	0–3	Canada	20–25	23–25	22–25			65–75	3,654	P2 Report
17 Sep	14:00	Canada	0–3	Turkey	21–25	16–25	25–27			62–77	598	P2 Report
17 Sep	21:40	Japan	3–0	Libya	25–20	25–17	25–12			75–49	4,833	P2 Report

=== Pool H ===
- Venue: SM Mall of Asia Arena

Pos	Team	Pld	W	L	Pts	SW	SL	SR	SPW	SPL	SPR	Qualification
1	Serbia	3	2	1	6	6	3	2.000	219	203	1.079	Final round
2	Czech Republic	3	2	1	6	6	3	2.000	202	201	1.005	Final round
3	Brazil	3	2	1	6	6	4	1.500	233	217	1.074	
4	China	3	0	3	0	1	9	0.111	216	249	0.867	

Source: FIVB Men's World Championship - Standings

Date	Time		Score		Set 1	Set 2	Set 3	Set 4	Set 5	Total	Attd	Report
14 Sep	17:30	Serbia	0–3	Czech Republic	22–25	23–25	20–25			65–75	3,347	P2 Report
14 Sep	21:00	Brazil	3–1	China	19–25	25–23	25–22	25–21		94–91	3,569	P2 Report
16 Sep	10:00	Brazil	3–0	Czech Republic	25–11	25–22	25–18			75–51	528	P2 Report
16 Sep	21:00	Serbia	3–0	China	25–18	25–19	29–27			79–64	4,998	P2 Report
18 Sep	10:00	Brazil	0–3	Serbia	22–25	20–25	22–25			64–75	900	P2 Report
18 Sep	21:00	Czech Republic	3–0	China	26–24	25–19	25–18			76–61	7,432	P2 Report

== Final round ==
- All times are Philippine Standard Time (UTC+08:00).
- Venue: SM Mall of Asia Arena

Round of 16
23 September
Tunisia	0
Czech Republic	3
23 September
Serbia	2
Iran	3
22 September
United States	3
Slovenia	1
22 September
Bulgaria	3
Portugal	0
20 September
Poland	3
Canada	1
20 September
Turkey	3
Netherlands	1
21 September
Argentina	0
Italy	3
21 September
Belgium	3
Finland	0

Quarterfinals
25 September
Czech Republic	3
Iran	1
25 September
United States	2
Bulgaria	3
24 September
Poland	3
Turkey	0
24 September
Italy	3
Belgium	0

Semifinals
27 September
Czech Republic	1
Bulgaria	3
27 September
Poland	0
Italy	3

Final
28 September
Bulgaria	1
Italy	3
3rd place match
28 September
Czech Republic	1
Poland	3

=== Round of 16 ===
Date	Time		Score		Set 1	Set 2	Set 3	Set 4	Set 5	Total	Attd	Report
20 Sep	15:30	Turkey	3–1	Netherlands	27–29	25–23	25–16	25–19		102–87	2,386	P2 Report
20 Sep	20:00	Poland	3–1	Canada	25–18	23–25	25–20	25–14		98–77	5,306	P2 Report
21 Sep	15:30	Argentina	0–3	Italy	23–25	20–25	22–25			65–75	4,903	P2 Report
21 Sep	20:00	Belgium	3–0	Finland	25–21	25–17	25–21			75–59	2,975	P2 Report
22 Sep	15:30	Bulgaria	3–0	Portugal	25–19	25–23	25–13			75–55	2,753	P2 Report
22 Sep	20:00	United States	3–1	Slovenia	19–25	25–22	25–17	25–20		94–84	4,734	P2 Report
23 Sep	15:30	Tunisia	0–3	Czech Republic	19–25	18–25	23–25			60–75	2,008	P2 Report
23 Sep	20:00	Serbia	2–3	Iran	25–23	19–25	26–24	22–25	9–15	101–112	2,903	P2 Report

=== Quarterfinals ===
Date	Time		Score		Set 1	Set 2	Set 3	Set 4	Set 5	Total	Attd	Report
24 Sep	15:30	Italy	3–0	Belgium	25–13	25–18	25–18			75–49	2,906	P2 Report
24 Sep	20:00	Poland	3–0	Turkey	25–15	25–22	25–19			75–56	4,267	P2 Report
25 Sep	15:30	Czech Republic	3–1	Iran	22–25	27–25	25–20	25–21		99–91	2,980	P2 Report
25 Sep	20:00	United States	2–3	Bulgaria	25–21	25–19	17–25	22–25	13–15	102–105	10,474	P2 Report

=== Semifinals ===
Date	Time		Score		Set 1	Set 2	Set 3	Set 4	Set 5	Total	Attd	Report
27 Sep	14:30	Czech Republic	1–3	Bulgaria	20–25	25–23	21–25	22–25		88–98	6,896	P2 Report
27 Sep	18:30	Poland	0–3	Italy	21–25	22–25	23–25			66–75	9,652	P2 Report

=== 3rd place match ===
Date	Time		Score		Set 1	Set 2	Set 3	Set 4	Set 5	Total	Attd	Report
28 Sep	14:30	Czech Republic	1–3	Poland	18–25	25–23	22–25	21–25		86–98	6,535	P2 Report

=== Final ===
Date	Time		Score		Set 1	Set 2	Set 3	Set 4	Set 5	Total	Attd	Report
28 Sep	18:30	Bulgaria	1–3	Italy	21–25	17–25	25–17	10–25		73–92	16,429	P2 Report

== Final standing ==
The final ranking for the tournament is based on the teams combined ranking system.

Rank	Team
1st place, gold medalist(s)	Italy
2nd place, silver medalist(s)	Bulgaria
3rd place, bronze medalist(s)	Poland
4	Czech Republic
5	United States
6	Turkey
7	Belgium
8	Iran
9	Argentina
10	Serbia
11	Slovenia
12	Tunisia
13	Netherlands
14	Canada
15	Finland
16	Portugal
17	Brazil
18	France
19	Philippines
20	Cuba
21	Germany
22	Qatar
23	Japan
24	Ukraine
25	Egypt
26	Colombia
27	South Korea
28	Libya
29	Romania
30	China
31	Chile
32	Algeria

Qualified for the 2027 World Championship

2025 Men's World champions

Italy
Fifth title

14–man roster
Alessandro Michieletto, Simone Giannelli (c), Fabio Balaso, Riccardo Sbertoli, Francesco Sani, Kamil Rychlicki, Mattia Bottolo, Gianluca Galassi, Yuri Romanò, Simone Anzani, Roberto Russo, Giovanni Gargiulo, Domenico Pace, Luca Porro
Head coach
(Italy) Ferdinando De Giorgi

== Awards ==
- Most valuable player
  (Italy) Alessandro Michieletto
- Best setter
  (Italy) Simone Giannelli
- Best outside spikers
  (Bulgaria) Aleksandar Nikolov
  (Italy) Alessandro Michieletto
- Best opposite spiker
  (Italy) Yuri Romanò
- Best middle blockers
  (Bulgaria) Aleks Grozdanov
  (Poland) Jakub Kochanowski
- Best libero
  (Italy) Fabio Balaso

== Statistics leaders ==
Statistics leaders correct as of final round.

Best Scorers
	Player	Attacks	Blocks	Serves	Total
1	Aleksandar Nikolov	154	7	12	173
2	Ferre Reggers	93	9	4	106
3	Patrik Indra	93	5	8	106
4	Lukáš Vašina	86	6	6	98
5	Ali Hajipour	80	12	2	94

Best Spikers
	Player	Pts.	Faults	Attacks	%	Total
1	Aleksandar Nikolov	154	40	95	53.29	289
2	Ferre Reggers	93	23	55	54.39	171
3	Patrik Indra	93	26	56	53.14	175
4	Lukáš Vašina	86	20	47	56.21	153
5	Ali Hajipour	80	27	41	54.05	148

Best Blockers
	Player	Blocks	Faults	Rebounds	Avg.	Total
1	Aleks Grozdanov	18	28	32	2.57	78
2	Roberto Russo	16	22	27	2.29	65
3	Jan Kozamernik	15	20	26	3.75	61
4	Martin Atanasov	14	12	9	2.00	35
5	Petteri Tyynismaa	13	23	39	3.25	75

Best Servers
	Player	Aces	Faults	Atp.	Avg.	%
1	Gabriel García	17	18	49	3.40	20.24
2	Yuri Romanò	15	19	58	2.14	16.30
3	Ramazan Efe Mandıracı	13	13	46	2.60	18.06
4	Michiel Ahyi	13	13	35	3.25	21.31
5	Simeon Nikolov	12	22	64	1.71	12.24

Best Setters
	Player	Success	Faults	Atp.	Avg.	%
1	Simeon Nikolov	236	4	322	33.71	41.99
2	Arshia Behnezhad	222	4	197	44.40	52.48
3	Simone Giannelli	200	1	225	28.57	46.95
4	Micah Christenson	191	4	195	38.20	48.97
5	Luboš Bartůněk	180	3	276	25.71	39.22

Best Diggers
	Player	Dig.	Faults	Recep.	Avg.	%
1	Gorik Lantsoght	43	14	18	8.60	57.33
2	Berkay Bayraktar	42	12	23	8.40	54.55
3	Milan Moník	42	19	21	6.00	51.22
4	Fabio Balaso	41	14	20	5.86	54.67
5	Jakub Popiwczak	33	18	30	4.71	40.74

Best Receivers
	Player	Success	Faults	Atp.	Avg.	%
1	Mattia Bottolo	40	8	77	5.71	32.00
2	Lukáš Vašina	38	12	101	5.43	25.17
3	Luka Marttila	37	4	64	9.25	35.24
4	Luciano Palonsky	34	6	86	8.50	26.98
5	Morteza Sharifi	33	11	88	6.60	25.00

== Marketing ==
Filipino indie band Ben&Ben was named as the official music partner in March 2025. The band's 2024 song "Triumph" was also used as the official song. In the same month, Philippines national team players Eya Laure and Bryan Bagunas were named ambassadors, followed by Philippine volleyball icon Alyssa Valdez who was added in June 2025.

The host nation's battle cry, "Set Na Natin 'To", the official anthem "Electrify" by Karencitta, the introduction of the mascots "Koolog", (Note: Koolog is a combination of the Filipino word "kulog" (which refers to thunder) and the idea of the mascot being energetic and dynamic.) "Hataw", (Note: Hataw represents strength, speed, and dynamism—qualities that are central to the sport of volleyball, especially with the fast-paced spikes and powerful movements on the court.) and "Kid Lat", (Note: Kid Lat is a playful name that represents speed, agility, and power—similar to a lightning strike—qualities that are essential in volleyball, especially with the rapid movements and quick reflexes required during matches. The name emphasizes the fast-paced, electrifying nature of the sport, with a fun, youthful twist, as "Kid" suggests energy and enthusiasm.) and the championship trophy were all unveiled during the ceremony at the SM Mall of Asia Music Hall, which took place one month prior to the competition. The organizing committee also did the "Set Na Natin 'To Mascot and Trophy" tour in three cities: Cebu City, Laoag, and Cagayan de Oro.

On 12 September 2025, prior to the opening match between the Philippines and Tunisia, K-pop group BoyNextDoor performed as the headline act for the opening ceremony, serving as global celebrity ambassadors for the event. The next day, the organizing committee announced that ticket prices had been lowered as a gift to the fans of the sport and in commemoration of President Bongbong Marcos's birthday. The prices were lowered by 30 percent, effective the following day.

== Concerns and controversies ==
=== Gambling platform sponsorship ===
The sponsorship of gambling platform 1xBet with the FIVB was scrutinized since 1xBet has no license to operate in the Philippines. It was clarified that the 1xBet only appears in Volleyball World for global subscribers of the FIVB streaming platform and the branding 1xBet does not appear on marketing materials or the actual venues.

Volleyball World confirmed that the television feed of the tournament for broadcast of the Philippine broadcaster Cignal TV is free of virtual overlay and graphics promoting unlicensed and unauthorized gambling platforms.

=== Ticket prices and attendance ===
Despite having been lowered by 30% starting on 14 September, the games' initially high ticket prices were again tackled by Philippine senators Erwin Tulfo and Risa Hontiveros, who made speeches in a Senate plenary session on 23 September. The senators noted the low attendance in those tournament games that did not involve the Philippines, Japan, and the United States, which they attributed to the high ticket prices, directing this lament to the Philippine National Volleyball Federation (PNVF) under the leadership of Ramon Suzara. The low attendance was also noted by the media arm of the Polish league PlusLiga. However, ticket prices were further slashed by half by the organizers during the last few matches of the knockout stage, and attendance spiked (notably during the quarterfinal five-set game won by Bulgaria against the crowd favorite Team USA), drawing crowds that almost reached or surpassed the 10,000-mark. On 28 September, tickets for the final game were reported to have sold out. Per FIVB's report, a total of 16,429 fans went to the SM Mall of Asia Arena to watch the final game.

=== Alleged censorship ===
Senator Erwin Tulfo also condemned the alleged censorship of the journalist who reported on the high ticket pricing controversy. John Mark Garcia of Sports Interactive Network Philippines (Spin.ph) had his media accreditation revoked for "negative reports".

The Philippines' National Press Club (NPC) also condemned what it said were attempts by the PNVF to censor media coverage of the tournament, alleging that the local Federation warned Rappler and other media outlets against publishing critical material about the event. The NPC also noted Suzara's prior libel charges against The Manila Times and Daily Tribune following the 2019 SEA Games, which were dismissed. Philippine Sports Commission chairman Patrick Gregorio made a successful request to the PNVF to reinstate Spin.ph's accreditation. The Philippine Sportswriters Association issued a statement condemning "backhanded form of censorship".

== Broadcasting rights ==
Country/region	Broadcaster
Philippines	Cignal
Brazil	Grupo Globo
Bulgaria	Max Sport bTV (Note: Bulgaria's quarterfinal and semifinal matches were simulcasted on Max Sport and bTV. The final was simulcasted on Max Sport, bTV, NOVA and BNT 1.); NOVA; BNT 1
Finland	YLE
Poland	Polsat

== See also ==
- 2025 FIVB Women's Volleyball World Championship
- 2025 FIVB Volleyball Men's U21 World Championship
- 2025 FIVB Volleyball Boys' U19 World Championship
