= Norway men's national under-19 volleyball team =

National U-19 volleyball team

Norway U19
- Association: Norwegian Volleyball Federation
- Confederation: CEV

Uniforms
Home	Away	Third

FIVB U19 World Championship
- Appearances: No Appearances

Europe U19 / U18 Championship
- Appearances: No Appearances

The Norway men's national under-19 volleyball team represents Norway in international men's volleyball competitions and friendly matches under the age 19 and it is ruled and managed by the Norwegian Volleyball Federation That is an affiliate of Federation of International Volleyball FIVB and also a part of European Volleyball Confederation CEV.

== Results ==
=== Summer Youth Olympics ===
Champions Runners up Third place Fourth place

Youth Olympic Games
Year	Round	Position	Pld	W	L	SW	SL	Squad
(Singapore) 2010	Didn't qualify							
(China) 2014	No Volleyball Event							
(Argentina) 2018	No Volleyball Event							
Total	0 Titles	0/1						

=== FIVB U19 World Championship ===
Champions Runners up Third place Fourth place

FIVB U19 World Championship
Year	Round	Position	Pld	W	L	SW	SL	Squad
(United Arab Emirates) 1989 To | (Uzbekistan) 2025	Didn't qualify							
Total	0 Titles	0/19						

=== Europe U19 / U18 Championship ===
Champions Runners up Third place Fourth place

Europe U19 / U18 Championship
Year	Round	Position	Pld	W	L	SW	SL	Squad
(Spain) 1995	Didn't qualify							
(Slovakia) 1997	Didn't qualify							
(Poland) 1999	Didn't qualify							
(Czech Republic) 2001	Didn't qualify							
(Croatia) 2003	Didn't qualify							
(Latvia) 2005	Didn't qualify							
(Austria) 2007	Didn't qualify							
(Netherlands) 2009	Didn't qualify							
(Turkey) 2011	Didn't qualify							
2013 Q	Group Stages	5th Placed						
2015 Q	Group Stages	Third Placed						
2017 Q	Group Stages	Third Placed						
2018 Q	Did not enter							
2020 Q	Group Stages	Third Placed						
2022 Q	On Hold							
Total	0 Titles	0/14						

== Team ==
=== Current squad ===
#	name	position	height	weight	birthday	spike	block
1	UTVIK Jonah	Setter	187	50	2005	313	244
2	JULIEBØ Ola Fløystad	Setter	181	50	2006	310	230
3	OLSEN Emil Severin	Libero	172	50	2005	300	217
4	SPIDSØ Conrad Åserud	Middle blocker	196	50	2006	324	256
5	VIK Espen	Outside spiker	184	50	2005	329	243
6	SLINNING Frithjof Moe	Outside spiker	182	50	2006	240	240
7	GUNDERSEN Jonatan Majak	Outside spiker	185	50	2006	315	240
8	FAGERVOLD Johannes Lagesen	Middle blocker	195	50	2006	323	250
9	RONESS Mads	Outside spiker	193	50	2005	335	255
11	AAS Even Stray	Outside spiker	195	50	2005	322	252
12	TVINDE Endre	Middle blocker	194	50	2006	323	258
13	SENUMSTAD Peder	Middle blocker	200	50	2006	240	240
14	KALSTAD Mikal	Libero	176	50	2006	240	231
15	HETTERVIK Magnus	Setter	185	50	2006	240	244
15	KJEMPERUD JOnah Andrè Lyngaas	Libero	169	50	2005	288	224
16	KLOPSTAD Daniel	Outside spiker	178	50	2006	295	229
17	ELLINGSEN Jens Petter Dalsbø	Outside spiker	188	50	2006	310	249
18	VESTÅ Gustav	Outside spiker	178	50	2005	313	230
19	SUNDE Sigurd Vingen	Libero	171	50	2006	282	232
20	HOPLAND Theodor Ekornes	Opposite	181	50	2006	306	238
21	TJETLAND Falk Eidså	Setter	182	50	2006	297	233
