= Denmark men's national under-19 volleyball team =

Denmark U19
- Association: Danish Volleyball Federation
- Confederation: CEV

Uniforms
Home	Away	Third

FIVB U19 World Championship
- Appearances: No Appearances

Europe U19 / U18 Championship
- Appearances: 1 (First in 2015)
- Best result: 11th place : (2015)

The Denmark men's national under-19 volleyball team represents Denmark in international men's volleyball competitions and friendly matches under the age 19 and it is ruled and managed by the Danish Volleyball Federation That is an affiliate of Federation of International Volleyball FIVB and also a part of European Volleyball Confederation CEV.

== Results ==
=== Summer Youth Olympics ===
Champions Runners up Third place Fourth place

Youth Olympic Games
Year	Round	Position	Pld	W	L	SW	SL	Squad
(Singapore) 2010	Didn't qualify							
(China) 2014	No Volleyball Event							
(Argentina) 2018	No Volleyball Event							
Total	0 Titles	0/1						

=== FIVB U19 World Championship ===
Champions Runners up Third place Fourth place

FIVB U19 World Championship
Year	Round	Position	Pld	W	L	SW	SL	Squad
(United Arab Emirates) 1989 To | (Uzbekistan) 2025	Didn't qualify							
Total	0 Titles	0/19						

=== Europe U19 / U18 Championship ===
Champions Runners up Third place Fourth place

Europe U19 / U18 Championship
Year	Round	Position	Pld	W	L	SW	SL	Squad
(Spain) 1995	Didn't qualify							
(Slovakia) 1997	Didn't qualify							
(Poland) 1999	Didn't qualify							
(Czech Republic) 2001	Didn't qualify							
(Croatia) 2003	Didn't qualify							
(Latvia) 2005	Didn't qualify							
(Austria) 2007	Didn't qualify							
(Netherlands) 2009	Didn't qualify							
(Turkey) 2011	Didn't qualify							
2013 Q	Second Round	6th Placed						Squad
(Turkey) 2015		11th place						Squad
2017 Q	Group Stages	Third Placed						Squad
2018 Q	Group Stages	4th Placed						Squad
2020 Q	Group Stages	Third Place						Squad
Total	0 Titles	1/14						

== Team ==
=== Current squad ===
#	name	position	height	weight	birthday	spike	block
1	MADSEN Hjalmer Elmbæk	Opposite	200	75	2005	336	250
2	EISENREICH Rasmus Reitz	Setter	191	75	2005	320	254
3	NILD William Emil	Opposite	197	75	2005	330	250
3	MABECK Anton Frederik Gregersen	Outside spiker	195	75	2005	325	250
4	BISGAARD Kristoffer Nørager	Setter	203	75	2005	341	255
6	BRINCK Andreas Sejer Kofod	Outside spiker	194	75	2006	326	242
7	JENSEN Jeppe Schousboe	Middle blocker	194	75	2005	319	251
8	OLDENBORG Victor Markwain	Outside spiker	186	75	2007	304	239
9	THYNEBJERG Laurits Schultz	Outside spiker	196	75	2005	343	244
10	MATHIASEN Uffe August	Middle blocker	193	75	2005	331	253
11	BASSØE Oliver	Outside spiker	190	75	2005	330	245
12	HANSEN Anton Spile	Setter	190	75	2006	308	244
12	LETH Oliver Rauschenberg	Middle blocker	192	75	2005	316	243
13	MARKER Lukas Lykkegaard	Outside spiker	181	75	2005	320	233
15	PETERSEN Jonas Enemark	Libero	183	75	2005	312	239
16	NAPIER Villads Flügge	Outside spiker	193	75	2006	331	246
17	NIELSEN Alexander Schou	Outside spiker	185	75	2005	320	236
18	HJØRDIE Nicolai	Middle blocker	194	80	2006	330	248
19	GILBERG Johan Scherfig	Libero	183	75	2005	305	238
20	ANDERSEN Villads Lundby	Opposite	196	75	2006	328	249
21	JESSEN Simon Lund	Outside spiker	203	75	2005	340	255
22	BEHREND Felix Jarl Willemoes	Middle blocker	198	75	2005	328	252
23	CHRISTENSEN Tobias Lytje	Setter	184	75	2005	304	234
24	ZACHARIASEN Albert Juul	Outside spiker	190	75	2005	321	243
29	HUSTED Thor Christian	Opposite	190	75	2005	330	245
