= Giovanni Gargiulo =

Italian volleyball player (born 1999)

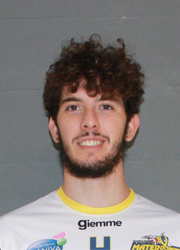
- Gargiulo in 2019

Personal information
- Nationality: Italian
- Born: 1 January 1999 (age 27); Sorrento, Italy
- Height: 2.10 m (6 ft 11 in)

Volleyball information
- Position: Middle blocker
- Current team: Lube
- Number: 3

Career
| Years | Teams |
|---|---|
| 2015–2020 | Materdomini |
| 2020–2022 | Callipo |
| 2022–2024 | Prisma |
| 2024 | Tourcoing |
| 2024– | Lube |

National team
| 2017 | Italy U-19 |
| 2018 | Italy U-20 |
| 2019 | Italy U-21 |
| 2025– | Italy |
Honours
Men's volleyball
Representing Italy
FIVB World Championship
| Gold medal – first place | 2025 Philippines |
Nations League
| Silver medal – second place | Ningbo 2025 |

Giovanni Maria Gargiulo (born 1 January 1999) is an Italian professional volleyball player who plays as a middle blocker for the Italian Volleyball League club, Lube and the Italy national team.

== Career ==
=== Club ===
Gargiulo began his career in the 2015–16 season with Materdomini in Serie A2, a club he remained with for five seasons. In the 2020–21 season, he made his Superleague debut thanks to a signing from Callipo; he also remained in the same division for the 2022–23 season when he signed for Prisma Taranto: at the end of the 2023–24 season, having concluded his commitments with the Apulian club, he finished the season with Tourcoing, in the French Ligue A.

In the 2024–25 season, Gargiulo joined Lube, also in the Superleague, with whom he won the Coppa Italia.

=== National team ===
In 2017, Gargiulo was called up to the Italian under-19 national team with which he won silver at the European Championship. This was followed in 2018 by call-ups to the under-20 national team and in 2019 to the under-21 national team, with the latter winning silver at the World Championship.

In 2025, Gargiulo received his first call-up to the senior national team, with which, in the same year, he won the silver medal at the Nations League.

== Honours ==
=== Club ===
- Domestic
  - 2024–25 Coppa Italia, with Lube
