= 2023 Men's African Nations Volleyball Championship =

African men's volleyball championships

2023 Men's African Nations Championship
بطولة إفريقيا للكرة الطائرة للرجال 2023

Tournament details
- Host country: Egypt
- City: Cairo
- Dates: 3–13 September
- Teams: 15 (from 1 confederation)
- Venues: 2 (in 1 host city)

Final positions
- Champions: Egypt (9th title)
- Runners-up: Algeria
- Third place: Libya
- Fourth place: Cameroon

Tournament awards
- MVP: (Egypt) Hossam Abdalla

The 2023 Men's African Nations Volleyball Championship was the 24th edition of the Men's African Volleyball Championship, a biennial international volleyball tournament organised by the African Volleyball Confederation (CAVB). The tournament was held in Cairo, Egypt from 3 to 13 September 2023. The top three teams of the tournament qualified for the 2025 FIVB Volleyball Men's World Championship as the CAVB representatives.

== Pools composition ==
CAVB announced the pool composition on 2 September 2023.

Pool A	Pool B	Pool C	Pool D
Egypt	Tunisia	Cameroon	Morocco
Burundi	Mali	Kenya	Rwanda
Algeria	Tanzania	Ghana	Senegal
—N/a	Chad	Libya	Gambia

== Venues ==
2023 Men's African Nations Volleyball Championship is located in Egypt	Cairo	
2023 Men's African Nations Volleyball Championship is located in Egypt	Cairo Stadium Indoor Halls Complex	
2023 Men's African Nations Volleyball Championship is located in Egypt	Hall 2	Hall 3
2023 Men's African Nations Volleyball Championship is located in Egypt	Capacity: 1,620	Capacity: 1,500

== Pool standing procedure ==
1. Number of matches won
2. Match points
3. Sets ratio
4. Points ratio
5. Result of the last match between the tied teams

Match won 3–0 or 3–1: 3 match points for the winner, 0 match points for the loser
Match won 3–2: 2 match points for the winner, 1 match point for the loser.

== Group stage ==
- All times are Eastern European Summer Time (UTC+03:00).

=== Pool A ===
Pos	Team	Pld	W	L	Pts	SW	SL	SR	SPW	SPL	SPR	Qualification
1	Algeria	2	2	0	6	6	0	MAX	150	99	1.515	Round of 15
2	Egypt (H)	2	1	1	3	3	3	1.000	137	104	1.317	Round of 15
3	Burundi	2	0	2	0	0	6	0.000	66	150	0.440	Round of 15

Source: FIVB
(H) Host

Date	Time		Score		Set 1	Set 2	Set 3	Set 4	Set 5	Total	Report
3 Sep	21:00	Egypt	3–0	Burundi	25–11	25–8	25–10			75–29	Report
5 Sep	10:00	Burundi	0–3	Algeria	10–25	9–25	18–25			37–75	Report
6 Sep	18:00	Algeria	3–0	Egypt	25–21	25–22	25–19			75–62	Report

=== Pool B ===
Pos	Team	Pld	W	L	Pts	SW	SL	SR	SPW	SPL	SPR	Qualification
1	Tunisia	3	3	0	9	9	0	MAX	225	108	2.083	Round of 15
2	Chad	3	2	1	6	6	3	2.000	198	208	0.952	Round of 15
3	Tanzania	3	1	2	3	3	7	0.429	206	247	0.834	Round of 15
4	Mali	3	0	3	0	1	9	0.111	178	244	0.730	Round of 15

Source: FIVB

Date	Time		Score		Set 1	Set 2	Set 3	Set 4	Set 5	Total	Report
4 Sep	16:00	Tunisia	3–0	Mali	25–8	25–14	25–7			75–29	Report
4 Sep	18:00	Chad	3–0	Tanzania	25–19	33–31	25–23			83–73	Report
5 Sep	10:00	Mali	1–3	Tanzania	18–25	22–25	25–17	24–26		89–93	Report
5 Sep	16:00	Tunisia	3–0	Chad	25–10	25–10	25–19			75–39	Report
6 Sep	14:00	Chad	3–0	Mali	26–24	25–17	25–19			76–60	Report
6 Sep	14:00	Tanzania	0–3	Tunisia	10–25	13–25	17–25			40–75	Report

=== Pool C ===
Pos	Team	Pld	W	L	Pts	SW	SL	SR	SPW	SPL	SPR	Qualification
1	Libya	3	3	0	9	9	2	4.500	265	235	1.128	Quarterfinals
2	Cameroon	3	2	1	6	7	4	1.750	269	237	1.135	Round of 15
3	Kenya	3	1	2	2	4	8	0.500	246	273	0.901	Round of 15
4	Ghana	3	0	3	1	3	9	0.333	237	272	0.871	Round of 15

Source: FIVB

Date	Time		Score		Set 1	Set 2	Set 3	Set 4	Set 5	Total	Report
4 Sep	12:00	Libya	3–1	Ghana	25–23	18–25	25–15	25–20		93–83	Report
4 Sep	18:00	Kenya	1–3	Cameroon	22–25	20–25	26–24	17–25		85–99	Report
5 Sep	12:00	Ghana	0–3	Cameroon	19–25	17–25	19–25			55–75	Report
5 Sep	18:00	Libya	3–0	Kenya	25–23	25–22	25–12			75–57	Report
6 Sep	16:00	Kenya	3–2	Ghana	23–25	25–21	16–25	25–17	15–11	104–99	Report
6 Sep	16:00	Cameroon	1–3	Libya	25–27	22–25	25–20	23–25		95–97	Report

=== Pool D ===
Pos	Team	Pld	W	L	Pts	SW	SL	SR	SPW	SPL	SPR	Qualification
1	Morocco	3	3	0	9	9	0	MAX	226	167	1.353	Round of 15
2	Rwanda	3	2	1	6	6	4	1.500	230	201	1.144	Round of 15
3	Gambia	3	1	2	2	4	8	0.500	241	269	0.896	Round of 15
4	Senegal	3	0	3	1	2	9	0.222	202	262	0.771	Round of 15

Source: FIVB

Date	Time		Score		Set 1	Set 2	Set 3	Set 4	Set 5	Total	Report
4 Sep	16:00	Morocco	3–0	Rwanda	25–17	25–18	26–24			76–59	Report
5 Sep	12:00	Gambia	1–3	Rwanda	11–25	11–25	25–20	24–26		71–96	Report
5 Sep	16:00	Senegal	0–3	Morocco	17–25	21–25	12–25			50–75	Report
6 Sep	12:00	Morocco	3–0	Gambia	25–20	25–23	25–15			75–58	Report
6 Sep	12:00	Rwanda	3–0	Senegal	25–21	25–16	25–17			75–54	Report
7 Sep	12:00	Senegal	2–3	Gambia	25–22	14–25	19–25	27–25	13–15	98–112	Report

== Final round ==
- All times are Eastern European Summer Time (UTC+03:00).

=== 9th–15th places ===
9th–15th quarterfinals
9 September
Ghana	3
Tanzania	1
Bye
Gambia	W
9 September
Mali	0
Kenya	3
9 September
Senegal	3
Burundi	0

9th–12th semifinals
11 September
Ghana	3
Gambia	2
11 September
Kenya	3
Senegal	0

9th place match
12 September
Ghana	2
Kenya	3
11th place match
12 September
Gambia	0
Senegal	3

13th–15th places
Tanzania	W
Bye
11 September
Mali	0
Burundi	3

13th place match
12 September
Tanzania	3
Burundi	1

==== 9th–15th quarterfinals ====
Date	Time		Score		Set 1	Set 2	Set 3	Set 4	Set 5	Total	Report
9 Sep	13:00	Senegal	3–0	Burundi	25–19	27–25	25–23			77–67	Report
9 Sep	15:00	Ghana	3–1	Tanzania	19–25	25–20	25–16	25–12		94–73	Report
9 Sep	17:00	Mali	0–3	Kenya	24–26	15–25	23–25			62–76	Report

==== 13th–15th places ====
Date	Time		Score		Set 1	Set 2	Set 3	Set 4	Set 5	Total	Report
11 Sep	13:00	Mali	0–3	Burundi	28–30	19–25	19–25			66–80	Report

==== 9th–12th semifinals ====
Date	Time		Score		Set 1	Set 2	Set 3	Set 4	Set 5	Total	Report
11 Sep	15:00	Ghana	3–2	Gambia	25–16	19–25	21–25	25–16	15–10	105–92	Report
11 Sep	17:00	Kenya	3–0	Senegal	25–14	25–18	25–23			75–55	Report

==== 13th place match ====
Date	Time		Score		Set 1	Set 2	Set 3	Set 4	Set 5	Total	Report
12 Sep	10:00	Tanzania	3–1	Burundi	25–20	22–25	25–20	25–16		97–81	Report

==== 11th place match ====
Date	Time		Score		Set 1	Set 2	Set 3	Set 4	Set 5	Total	Report
12 Sep	10:00	Gambia	0–3	Senegal	20–25	21–25	23–25			64–75	Report

==== 9th place match ====
Date	Time		Score		Set 1	Set 2	Set 3	Set 4	Set 5	Total	Report
12 Sep	12:00	Ghana	2–3	Kenya	19–25	21–25	25–18	32–30	14–16	111–114	Report

=== 5th–8th places ===
5th–8th semifinals
11 September
Rwanda	3
Chad	0
11 September
Morocco	0
Tunisia	3

5th place match
12 September
Rwanda	0
Tunisia	3
7th place match
12 September
Chad	3
Morocco (Note: Morocco forfeited the match on 12 September giving Chad a 3–0 win.)	0

==== 5th–8th semifinals ====
Date	Time		Score		Set 1	Set 2	Set 3	Set 4	Set 5	Total	Report
11 Sep	13:00	Rwanda	3–0	Chad	25–21	25–18	25–20			75–59	Report
11 Sep	15:00	Morocco	0–3	Tunisia	19–25	15–25	20–25			54–75	Report

==== 7th place match ====
Date	Time		Score		Set 1	Set 2	Set 3	Set 4	Set 5	Total	Report
12 Sep	12:00	Chad	3–0	Morocco	25–0	25–0	25–0			75–0	Report

==== 5th place match ====
Date	Time		Score		Set 1	Set 2	Set 3	Set 4	Set 5	Total	Report
12 Sep	14:00	Rwanda	0–3	Tunisia	17–25	18–25	21–25			56–75	Report

=== Championship bracket ===
Round of 15
8 September
Algeria	3
Ghana	0
8 September
Rwanda	3
Tanzania	1
Libya	W
Bye
8 September
Chad	3
Gambia	1
8 September
Morocco	3
Mali	0
8 September
Egypt	3
Kenya	0
8 September
Tunisia	3
Senegal	0
8 September
Cameroon	3
Burundi	0

Quarterfinals
9 September
Algeria	3
Rwanda	0
9 September
Libya	3
Chad	0
9 September
Morocco	0
Egypt	3
9 September
Tunisia	1
Cameroon	3

Semifinals
11 September
Algeria	3
Libya	2
11 September
Egypt	3
Cameroon	1

Final
13 September
Algeria	1
Egypt	3
3rd place match
13 September
Libya	3
Cameroon	1

==== Round of 15 ====
Date	Time		Score		Set 1	Set 2	Set 3	Set 4	Set 5	Total	Report
8 Sep	13:00	Rwanda	3–1	Tanzania	25–22	27–29	25–21	25–12		102–84	Report
8 Sep	13:00	Cameroon	3–0	Burundi	25–14	25–14	25–13			75–41	Report
8 Sep	15:00	Tunisia	3–0	Senegal	25–10	25–13	25–18			75–41	Report
8 Sep	15:00	Chad	3–1	Gambia	24–26	25–12	25–22	25–16		99–76	Report
8 Sep	17:00	Morocco	3–0	Mali	25–14	25–10	25–15			75–39	Report
8 Sep	17:00	Algeria	3–0	Ghana	25–22	25–21	25–20			75–63	Report
8 Sep	19:00	Egypt	3–0	Kenya	25–17	25–19	27–25			77–61	Report

==== Quarterfinals ====
Date	Time		Score		Set 1	Set 2	Set 3	Set 4	Set 5	Total	Report
9 Sep	15:00	Algeria	3–0	Rwanda	25–18	27–25	25–16			77–59	Report
9 Sep	17:00	Tunisia	1–3	Cameroon	25–22	20–25	25–27	17–25		87–99	Report
9 Sep	19:00	Morocco	0–3	Egypt	19–25	23–25	18–25			60–75	Report
9 Sep	19:00	Libya	3–0	Chad	25–20	26–24	25–17			76–61	Report

==== Semifinals ====
Date	Time		Score		Set 1	Set 2	Set 3	Set 4	Set 5	Total	Report
11 Sep	17:00	Algeria	3–2	Libya	18–25	25–15	33–35	25–22	15–11	116–108	Report
11 Sep	19:00	Egypt	3–1	Cameroon	25–13	25–23	20–25	29–27		99–88	Report

==== 3rd place match ====
Date	Time		Score		Set 1	Set 2	Set 3	Set 4	Set 5	Total	Report
13 Sep	16:00	Libya	3–1	Cameroon	22–25	25–22	25–23	25–15		97–85	Report

==== Final ====
Date	Time		Score		Set 1	Set 2	Set 3	Set 4	Set 5	Total	Report
13 Sep	19:00	Algeria	1–3	Egypt	22–25	18–25	25–20	22–25		87–95	Report

== Final standing ==
Rank	Team
1st place, gold medalist(s)	Egypt
2nd place, silver medalist(s)	Algeria
3rd place, bronze medalist(s)	Libya
4	Cameroon
5	Tunisia
6	Rwanda
7	Chad
8	Morocco
9	Kenya
10	Ghana
11	Senegal
12	Gambia
13	Tanzania
14	Burundi
15	Mali

Qualified for the 2025 World Championship
Qualified for the 2025 World Championship via FIVB World Ranking

2023 Men's African Nations champions

Egypt
9th title

== Awards ==
- Abdlalah Hossam : MVP.
- Shafik Ahmed : Outsider Hitter
- Dolegombal Sem : Best Blocker
- Ikhbayri Ahmed : Opposite
- Seoudy Abdelrhman : Best Blocker
- Abdalla Hossam : Best Setters
- Hosni Soufiane : Outside Hitter
- Ilyas Achouri : Best libero.
- Ahmed Salah : Best Fair-play player

== See also ==
- 2023 Women's African Nations Volleyball Championship
