= Davide Gardini =

Italian volleyball player (born 1999)

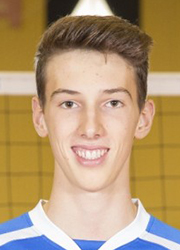

Personal information
- Full name: Davide Gardini
- Nationality: Italian
- Born: 11 February 1999 (age 27)
- Height: 2.05 m (6 ft 9 in)
- Weight: 80 kg (180 lb)
- Spike: 330 cm (130 in)
- Block: 310 cm (120 in)
- Education: Brigham Young University

Volleyball information
- Position: Outside hitter
- Current club: Power Volley Milano
- Number: 13

Career
Years	Teams
2015–2018	Club Italia Roma
2018–2022	Brigham Young University
2022–2024	Pallavolo Padova
2024 - Present	Power Volley Milano

National team
Italy U19
Honours
World University Games
Gold medal – first place	2021 Chengdu
- Last updated: 4 September 2017

Davide Gardini (born 11 February 1999) is an Italian volleyball player and was an outside hitter for the BYU volleyball team. He previously played for the Italian A2 League team Club Italia Roma and currently plays for Power Volley Milano.

== Personal life ==
His father is Andrea Gardini, a former volleyball player, multimedalist, three-time World Champion, and head coach.

== Career ==
Gardini competed at 2017 CEV U19 European Championship, where his national team lost in the finale to the Czech Republic. He won the silver medal and an individual award as one of the Best Outside Spikers.

== Sporting achievements ==
=== National team ===
- 2017 CEV U19 European Championship

=== Individually ===
- 2017 CEV U19 European Championship - Best Outside Spiker
