= Aleks Grozdanov =

Bulgarian volleyball player (born 1998)

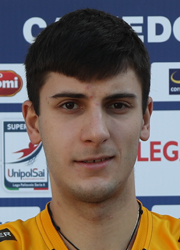

Personal information
- Born: 28 March 1998 (age 28) Sofia, Bulgaria
- Height: 2.06 m (6 ft 9 in)
- Weight: 90 kg (198 lb)
- Spike: 360 cm (142 in)

Volleyball information
- Position: Middle blocker
- Current club: LUK Lublin
- Number: 11

Career
- Years: Team
- 2016–2017 2017–2018 2018–2019 2019–2021 2021–2022 2022–2024 2024–: Dobrudzha 07; Verona Volley; Greenyard Maaseik; Consar Ravenna; Vero Volley Monza; Verona Volley; LUK Lublin

National team
- Years: Team
- –: Bulgaria
Honours
Men's volleyball
Representing Bulgaria
FIVB World Championship
Silver medal – second place	2025 Philippines

Aleks Grozdanov (Bulgarian: Алекс Грозданов; born 28 March 1998) is a Bulgarian professional volleyball player who plays as a middle blocker for Bogdanka LUK Lublin and the Bulgaria national team.

== Honours ==
=== Club ===
- CEV Cup
  - 2021–22 – with Vero Volley Monza
- CEV Challenge Cup
  - 2024–25 – with Bogdanka LUK Lublin
- Domestic
  - 2016–17 Bulgarian Cup, with Dobrudzha 07
  - 2018–19 Belgian Championship, with Greenyard Maaseik
  - 2024–25 Polish Championship, with Bogdanka LUK Lublin
  - 2025–26 Polish SuperCup, with Bogdanka LUK Lublin
  - 2025–26 Polish Cup, with Bogdanka LUK Lublin
  - 2026–27 Polish SuperCup, with Bogdanka LUK Lublin

=== Individual awards ===
- 2025: FIVB World Championship – Best middle blocker
- 2026: Polish Cup – Best middle blocker
