= 2017 Boys' U19 Volleyball European Championship =

Tournament details
- Host country: Hungary; Slovakia
- Dates: 22–30 April
- Teams: 12
- Venues: 2 (in 2 host cities)

Final positions
- Champions: Czech Republic (1st title)

Tournament awards
- MVP: (Turkey) Adis Lagumdzija

The 2017 Boys' Youth European Volleyball Championship was played in Slovakia and Hungary from 22 to 30 April 2017. The top six teams qualified for the 2017 Youth World Championship.

== Participating teams ==
- Hosts
  - Hungary
  - Slovakia
- Qualified through 2017 Boys' Youth European Volleyball Championship Qualification
  - Belgium
  - Bulgaria
  - Czech Republic
  - Finland
  - France
  - Italy
  - Poland
  - Romania
  - Russia
  - Turkey

== Pools composition ==
| Pool A | Pool B |
|---|---|
| Hungary | Slovakia |
| Poland | Romania |
| Italy | Turkey |
| Bulgaria | Finland |
| Russia | France |
| Belgium | Czech Republic |

== Preliminary round ==
=== Pool I ===
- Venue: Győr, Hungary

| Pos | Team | Pld | W | L | Pts | SW | SL | SR | SPW | SPL | SPR | Qualification |
|---|---|---|---|---|---|---|---|---|---|---|---|---|
| 1 | Russia | 5 | 5 | 0 | 14 | 15 | 2 | 7.500 | 408 | 337 | 1.211 | Semifinals |
| 2 | Italy | 5 | 4 | 1 | 10 | 12 | 7 | 1.714 | 419 | 369 | 1.136 | Semifinals |
| 3 | Poland | 5 | 3 | 2 | 10 | 11 | 8 | 1.375 | 416 | 388 | 1.072 | 5th–8th Semifinals |
| 4 | Belgium | 5 | 2 | 3 | 7 | 9 | 9 | 1.000 | 394 | 391 | 1.008 | 5th–8th Semifinals |
| 5 | Hungary | 5 | 1 | 4 | 2 | 3 | 14 | 0.214 | 318 | 403 | 0.789 | |
| 6 | Bulgaria | 5 | 0 | 5 | 2 | 5 | 15 | 0.333 | 395 | 462 | 0.855 | |

| Date | Time | | Score | | Set 1 | Set 2 | Set 3 | Set 4 | Set 5 | Total | Report |
|---|---|---|---|---|---|---|---|---|---|---|---|
| 22 Apr | 15:30 | Poland | 2–3 | Russia | 25–23 | 23–25 | 19–25 | 25–16 | 15–17 | 107–106 | Report |
| 22 Apr | 18:00 | Hungary | 0–3 | Belgium | 21–25 | 19–25 | 23–25 | | | 63–75 | Report |
| 22 Apr | 20:30 | Bulgaria | 2–3 | Italy | 26–24 | 15–25 | 16–25 | 25–19 | 13–15 | 95–108 | Report |
| 23 Apr | 15:30 | Belgium | 0–3 | Russia | 20–25 | 19–25 | 22–25 | | | 61–75 | Report |
| 23 Apr | 18:00 | Hungary | 3–2 | Bulgaria | 25–27 | 25–19 | 25–23 | 16–25 | 15–9 | 106–103 | Report |
| 23 Apr | 20:30 | Italy | 3–0 | Poland | 25–9 | 25–21 | 25–15 | | | 75–45 | Report |
| 24 Apr | 15:30 | Bulgaria | 0–3 | Belgium | 19–25 | 21–25 | 20–25 | | | 60–75 | Report |
| 24 Apr | 18:00 | Poland | 3–0 | Hungary | 25–15 | 25–13 | 25–14 | | | 75–42 | Report |
| 24 Apr | 20:30 | Russia | 3–0 | Italy | 25–17 | 27–25 | 25–17 | | | 77–59 | Report |
| 26 Apr | 15:30 | Bulgaria | 1–3 | Poland | 23–25 | 17–25 | 25–23 | 19–25 | | 84–98 | Report |
| 26 Apr | 18:00 | Hungary | 0–3 | Russia | 14–25 | 21–25 | 22–25 | | | 57–75 | Report |
| 26 Apr | 20:30 | Belgium | 2–3 | Italy | 25–19 | 25–18 | 23–25 | 16–25 | 13–15 | 102–102 | Report |
| 27 Apr | 15:30 | Russia | 3–0 | Bulgaria | 25–16 | 25–19 | 25–18 | | | 75–53 | Report |
| 27 Apr | 18:00 | Italy | 3–0 | Hungary | 25–16 | 25–15 | 25–19 | | | 75–50 | Report |
| 27 Apr | 20:30 | Poland | 3–1 | Belgium | 16–25 | 25–23 | 25–18 | 25–15 | | 91–81 | Report |

=== Pool II ===
- Venue: Púchov, Slovakia

| Pos | Team | Pld | W | L | Pts | SW | SL | SR | SPW | SPL | SPR | Qualification |
|---|---|---|---|---|---|---|---|---|---|---|---|---|
| 1 | Turkey | 5 | 4 | 1 | 12 | 13 | 4 | 3.250 | 400 | 359 | 1.114 | Semifinals |
| 2 | Czech Republic | 5 | 4 | 1 | 11 | 13 | 6 | 2.167 | 437 | 386 | 1.132 | Semifinals |
| 3 | France | 5 | 4 | 1 | 11 | 12 | 8 | 1.500 | 481 | 428 | 1.124 | 5th–8th Semifinals |
| 4 | Finland | 5 | 2 | 3 | 6 | 8 | 10 | 0.800 | 393 | 412 | 0.954 | 5th–8th Semifinals |
| 5 | Romania | 5 | 1 | 4 | 3 | 5 | 14 | 0.357 | 371 | 436 | 0.851 | |
| 6 | Slovakia | 5 | 0 | 5 | 2 | 6 | 15 | 0.400 | 417 | 478 | 0.872 | |

| Date | Time | | Score | | Set 1 | Set 2 | Set 3 | Set 4 | Set 5 | Total | Report |
|---|---|---|---|---|---|---|---|---|---|---|---|
| 22 Apr | 15:00 | Czech Republic | 3–1 | Turkey | 22–25 | 25–18 | 25–16 | 25–16 | | 97–75 | Report |
| 22 Apr | 17:30 | Slovakia | 1–3 | France | 23–25 | 25–23 | 19–25 | 15–25 | | 82–98 | Report |
| 22 Apr | 20:00 | Finland | 3–0 | Romania | 25–20 | 25–13 | 25–17 | | | 75–50 | Report |
| 23 Apr | 15:00 | Turkey | 3–0 | France | 25–18 | 25–23 | 28–26 | | | 78–67 | Report |
| 23 Apr | 17:30 | Romania | 3–2 | Slovakia | 23–25 | 25–16 | 25–18 | 16–25 | 15–10 | 104–94 | Report |
| 23 Apr | 20:00 | Czech Republic | 3–0 | Finland | 25–20 | 25–20 | 25–18 | | | 75–58 | Report |
| 24 Apr | 15:00 | France | 3–2 | Romania | 25–27 | 25–16 | 25–21 | 23–25 | 19–17 | 117–106 | Report |
| 24 Apr | 17:30 | Slovakia | 2–3 | Czech Republic | 20–25 | 22–25 | 25–20 | 25–20 | 12–15 | 104–105 | Report |
| 24 Apr | 20:00 | Finland | 1–3 | Turkey | 20–25 | 22–25 | 25–22 | 20–25 | | 87–97 | Report |
| 26 Apr | 15:00 | Czech Republic | 1–3 | France | 25–23 | 21–25 | 23–25 | 16–25 | | 85–98 | Report |
| 26 Apr | 17:30 | Finland | 3–1 | Slovakia | 21–25 | 25–19 | 25–23 | 25–22 | | 96–89 | Report |
| 26 Apr | 20:00 | Turkey | 3–0 | Romania | 25–22 | 25–23 | 25–15 | | | 75–60 | Report |
| 27 Apr | 15:00 | France | 3–1 | Finland | 25–19 | 26–28 | 25–18 | 25–12 | | 101–77 | Report |
| 27 Apr | 17:30 | Romania | 0–3 | Czech Republic | 21–25 | 10–25 | 20–25 | | | 51–75 | Report |
| 27 Apr | 20:00 | Slovakia | 0–3 | Turkey | 21–25 | 14–25 | 13–25 | | | 48–75 | Report |

== Final round ==
=== 5th–8th place ===
Semifinals
29 April
Poland | 3
Finland | 1
29 April
Belgium | 1
France | 3

5th place
30 April
Poland | 3
France | 0
7th place
30 April
Finland | 1
Belgium | 3

==== 5th–8th semifinals ====
| Date | Time | | Score | | Set 1 | Set 2 | Set 3 | Set 4 | Set 5 | Total | Report |
|---|---|---|---|---|---|---|---|---|---|---|---|
| 29 Apr | 13:00 | Poland | 3–1 | Finland | 17–25 | 27–25 | 25–16 | 25–21 | | 94–87 | Report |
| 29 Apr | 15:30 | Belgium | 1–3 | France | 25–21 | 16–25 | 21–25 | 23–25 | | 85–96 | Report |

==== 7th place match ====
| Date | Time | | Score | | Set 1 | Set 2 | Set 3 | Set 4 | Set 5 | Total | Report |
|---|---|---|---|---|---|---|---|---|---|---|---|
| 30 Apr | 10:00 | Finland | 1–3 | Belgium | 25–22 | 20–25 | 19–25 | 15–25 | | 79–97 | Report |

==== 5th place match ====
| Date | Time | | Score | | Set 1 | Set 2 | Set 3 | Set 4 | Set 5 | Total | Report |
|---|---|---|---|---|---|---|---|---|---|---|---|
| 30 Apr | 12:30 | Poland | 3–0 | France | 25–22 | 25–15 | 25–15 | | | 75–52 | Report |

=== Final ===
Semifinals
29 April
Russia | 2
Czech Republic | 3
29 April
Turkey | 2
Italy | 3

Final
30 April
Czech Republic | 3
Italy | 2
Third place
30 April
Russia | 2
Turkey | 3

==== Semifinals ====
| Date | Time | | Score | | Set 1 | Set 2 | Set 3 | Set 4 | Set 5 | Total | Report |
|---|---|---|---|---|---|---|---|---|---|---|---|
| 29 Apr | 18:00 | Russia | 2–3 | Czech Republic | 25–16 | 22–25 | 25–18 | 23–25 | 10–15 | 105–99 | Report |
| 29 Apr | 20:30 | Turkey | 2–3 | Italy | 25–18 | 23–25 | 25–20 | 21–25 | 9–15 | 103–103 | Report |

==== 3rd place match ====
| Date | Time | | Score | | Set 1 | Set 2 | Set 3 | Set 4 | Set 5 | Total | Report |
|---|---|---|---|---|---|---|---|---|---|---|---|
| 30 Apr | 15:30 | Russia | 2–3 | Turkey | 22–25 | 25–21 | 26–24 | 17–25 | 13–15 | 103–110 | Report |

==== Final ====
| Date | Time | | Score | | Set 1 | Set 2 | Set 3 | Set 4 | Set 5 | Total | Report |
|---|---|---|---|---|---|---|---|---|---|---|---|
| 30 Apr | 18:30 | Czech Republic | 3–2 | Italy | 25–19 | 14–25 | 25–17 | 19–25 | 15–13 | 98–99 | Report |

== Final standing ==
| Rank | Team |
|---|---|
| 1st place, gold medalist(s) | Czech Republic |
| 2nd place, silver medalist(s) | Italy |
| 3rd place, bronze medalist(s) | Turkey |
| 4 | Russia |
| 5 | Poland |
| 6 | France |
| 7 | Belgium |
| 8 | Finland |
| 9 | Romania |
| 10 | Hungary |
| 11 | Slovakia |
| 12 | Bulgaria |

| Qualified for the 2017 Boys' U19 World Championship |

2017 Boys' U19 European champions

Czech Republic
1st title

12–man roster
Jan Pavlíček, Radim Šulc, Ondřej Piskáček, Josef Polák, Filip Humler, Miroslav Drozen, Jan Svoboda, Lukáš Vašina, Michal Roháček, Pavel Horák, Marek Šotola, Jakub Varous
Head coach
Jiří Zach

== Awards ==
At the conclusion of the tournament, the following players were selected as the tournament dream team.

- Most valuable player
  (Turkey) Adis Lagumdzija
- Best setter
  (Czech Republic) Ondřej Piskáček
- Best outside spikers
  (Turkey) Batuhan Avci
  (Italy) Davide Gardini
- Best middle blockers
  (Italy) Lorenzo Cortesia
  (Russia) Vitalii Dikarev
- Best opposite spiker
  (Czech Republic) Marek Šotola
- Best libero
  (Italy) Filippo Federici
