= Marek Šotola =

Czech volleyball player (born 1999)

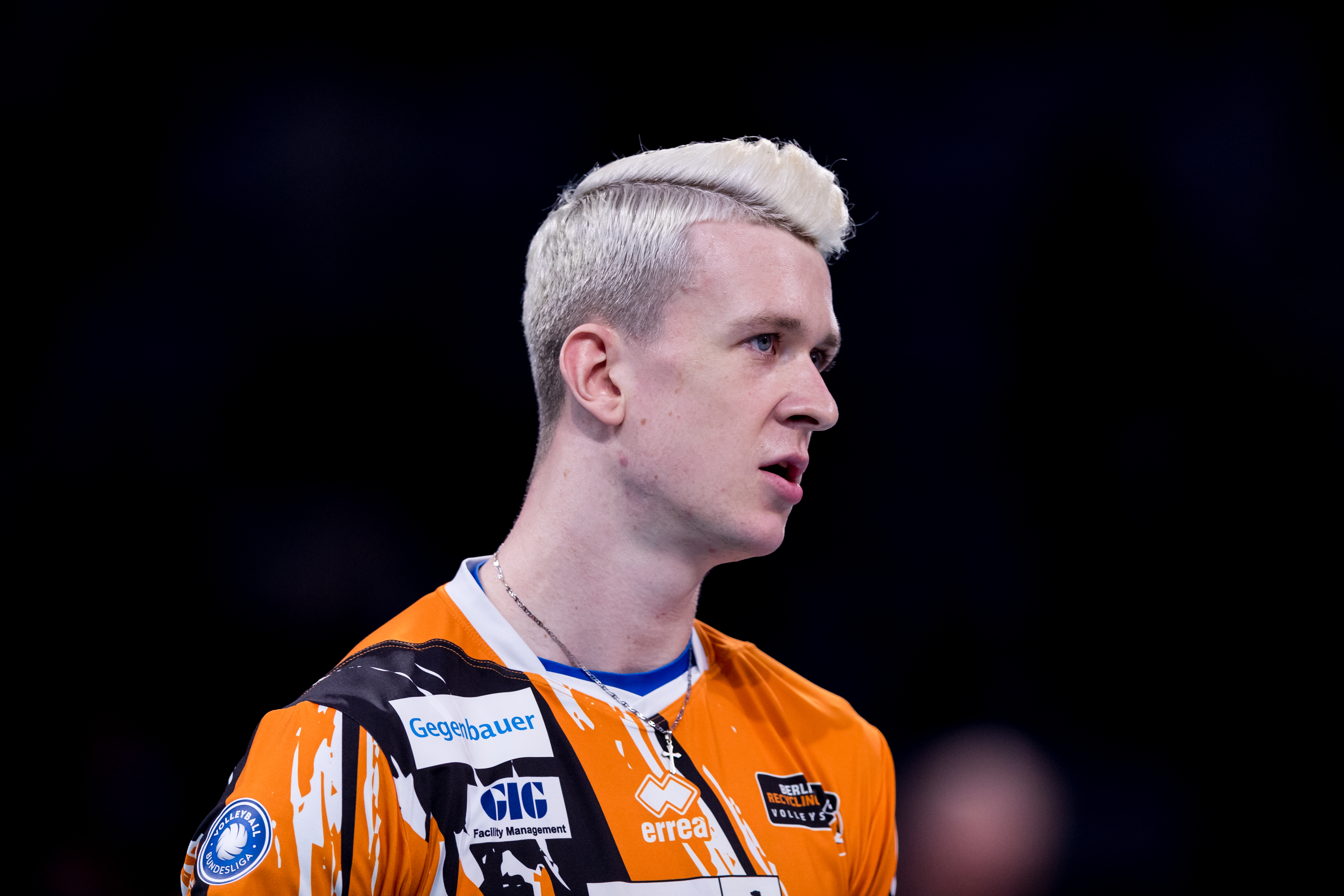

Personal information
- Born: 5 November 1999 (age 26); České Budějovice, Czech Republic
- Height: 2.06 m (6 ft 9 in)
- Weight: 96 kg (212 lb)
- Spike: 355 cm (140 in)
- Block: 330 cm (130 in)

Volleyball information
- Position: Opposite
- Current club: Halkbank Ankara
- Number: 17

Career
Years	Teams
–2020; 2020–2021; 2021–2024; 2024–	Jihostroj České Budějovice; Stade Poitevin Poitiers; Berlin Recycling Volleys; Halkbank Ankara

National team
Czech Republic
Honours
Men's volleyball
Representing Czech Republic
European League
Gold medal – first place	2022 Croatia

Marek Šotola (born 5 November 1999) is a Czech professional volleyball player who plays as an opposite spiker for Halkbank Ankara and the Czech Republic national team.

== Honours ==
- Domestic
  - 2016–17 Czech Championship, with Jihostroj České Budějovice
  - 2018–19 Czech Cup, with Jihostroj České Budějovice
  - 2018–19 Czech Championship, with Jihostroj České Budějovice
  - 2019–20 Czech Cup, with Jihostroj České Budějovice
  - 2021–22 German SuperCup, with Berlin Recycling Volleys
  - 2021–22 German Championship, with Berlin Recycling Volleys
  - 2022–23 German SuperCup, with Berlin Recycling Volleys
  - 2022–23 German Cup, with Berlin Recycling Volleys
  - 2022–23 German Championship, with Berlin Recycling Volleys
  - 2023–24 German SuperCup, with Berlin Recycling Volleys
  - 2023–24 German Cup, with Berlin Recycling Volleys
  - 2023–24 German Championship, with Berlin Recycling Volleys

=== Youth national team ===
- 2017 CEV U19 European Championship
- 2018 CEV U20 European Championship

=== Individual awards ===
- 2017: CEV U19 European Championship – Best opposite spiker
- 2018: CEV U20 European Championship – Best opposite spiker
