= Ali Hajipour (volleyball) =

Iranian volleyball player

Personal information
- Born: 1 July 2001 (24 years old); Faruj, Iran
- Height: 201 cm (6 ft 7 in)
- Weight: 90 kg (198 lb)
- Spike: 3.71 m (146 in)
- Block: 3.55 m (140 in)

Volleyball information
- Position: Opposite hitter
- Current club: Foolad Sirjan
- Number: 17

National team
Iran men's national volleyball team
Honours
Men's volleyball
Representing Iran
Gold medal – first place	2025	Team
Asian Men's Volleyball Championship
Silver medal – second place	JPN 2026	Team
Asian Games
Gold medal – first place	Nagoya 2026	Team

Ali Hajipour is an Iranian volleyball player who plays as an opposite for Foolad Sirjan in the Iranian Volleyball Super League and the Iran national team. He played an important role for Iran reaching the quarterfinals of the 2025 FIVB World Championship.
