= 2017 Boys' U19 Volleyball European Championship Qualification =

This is an article about qualification for the 2017 Boys' Youth European Volleyball Championship.

== Qualification summary ==
- Belgium
- Bulgaria
- Czech Republic
- Finland
- France
- Hungary
- Italy
- Poland
- Romania
- Russia
- Slovakia
- Turkey

== Pool standing procedure ==
1. Number of matches won
2. Match points
3. Sets ratio
4. Points ratio
5. Result of the last match between the tied teams

Match won 3–0 or 3–1: 3 match points for the winner, 0 match points for the loser
Match won 3–2: 2 match points for the winner, 1 match point for the loser

== Direct qualification ==
Host countries, Slovakia and Hungary, qualified for final round directly.

== Qualification ==
The winners of each pools and the two second placed teams qualified for final round. Because Pool H has only three teams. The second placed teams will cut the result which they play with the fourth ranked teams before consider the qualified teams.

- Pools composition

Pool A	Pool B	Pool C	Pool D	Pool E	Pool F	Pool G	Pool H
Poland	Russia	Turkey	France	Belgium	Italy	Bulgaria	Finland
Czech Rep.	Spain	Serbia	Estonia	Romania	Germany	Belarus	Austria
Latvia	Greece	Netherlands	Slovenia	Portugal	Ukraine	Denmark	Norway
Sweden	Israel	Montenegro	Switzerland	Iceland	Croatia	Georgia	

=== Pool A ===
Pos	Team	Pld	W	L	Pts	SW	SL	SR	SPW	SPL	SPR	Qualification
1	Poland	3	3	0	8	9	2	4.500	255	214	1.192	2017 European Championship
2	Czech Republic	3	1	2	5	7	6	1.167	281	253	1.111	2017 European Championship
3	Sweden	3	1	2	3	3	6	0.500	173	208	0.832	
4	Latvia	3	1	2	2	3	8	0.375	218	252	0.865	

Date	Time		Score		Set 1	Set 2	Set 3	Set 4	Set 5	Total	Report
13 Jan	15:30	Latvia	3–2	Czech Republic	22–25	16–25	25–18	25–18	17–15	105–101	Report
13 Jan	18:00	Poland	3–0	Sweden	25–19	25–18	25–17			75–54	Report
14 Jan	15:30	Czech Republic	3–0	Sweden	25–11	25–17	25–16			75–44	Report
14 Jan	18:00	Latvia	0–3	Poland	24–26	11–25	20–25			55–76	Report
15 Jan	15:30	Sweden	3–0	Latvia	25–22	25–19	25–17			75–58	Report
15 Jan	18:00	Czech Republic	2–3	Poland	25–19	20–25	22–25	25–20	13–15	105–104	Report

=== Pool B ===
Pos	Team	Pld	W	L	Pts	SW	SL	SR	SPW	SPL	SPR	Qualification
1	Russia	3	3	0	8	9	2	4.500	261	222	1.176	2017 European Championship
2	Spain	3	1	2	4	5	6	0.833	251	251	1.000	
3	Greece	3	1	2	3	4	6	0.667	228	240	0.950	
4	Israel	3	1	2	3	3	7	0.429	223	250	0.892	

Date	Time		Score		Set 1	Set 2	Set 3	Set 4	Set 5	Total	Report
13 Jan	17:30	Spain	2–3	Russia	25–23	19–25	25–23	22–25	13–15	104–111	Report
13 Jan	20:00	Greece	1–3	Israel	28–26	19–25	22–25	23–25		92–101	Report
14 Jan	17:30	Russia	3–0	Israel	25–19	25–19	25–19			75–57	Report
14 Jan	20:00	Spain	0–3	Greece	22–25	23–25	19–25			64–75	Report
15 Jan	17:30	Israel	0–3	Spain	15–25	19–25	31–33			65–83	Report
15 Jan	20:00	Russia	3–0	Greece	25–23	25–15	25–23			75–61	Report

=== Pool C ===
Pos	Team	Pld	W	L	Pts	SW	SL	SR	SPW	SPL	SPR	Qualification
1	Turkey	3	3	0	9	9	1	9.000	250	188	1.330	2017 European Championship
2	Serbia	3	2	1	6	6	3	2.000	216	191	1.131	
3	Netherlands	3	1	2	3	4	7	0.571	247	255	0.969	
4	Montenegro	3	0	3	0	1	9	0.111	161	240	0.671	

Date	Time		Score		Set 1	Set 2	Set 3	Set 4	Set 5	Total	Report
13 Jan	15:30	Netherlands	0–3	Serbia	27–29	18–25	23–25			68–79	Report
13 Jan	18:00	Turkey	3–0	Montenegro	25–10	25–14	25–13			75–37	Report
14 Jan	15:30	Serbia	3–0	Montenegro	25–20	25–8	25–19			75–47	Report
14 Jan	18:00	Netherlands	1–3	Turkey	26–24	23–25	21–25	19–25		89–99	Report
15 Jan	15:30	Montenegro	1–3	Netherlands	10–25	25–15	19–25	23–25		77–90	Report
15 Jan	18:00	Serbia	0–3	Turkey	20–25	24–26	18–25			62–76	Report

=== Pool D ===
Pos	Team	Pld	W	L	Pts	SW	SL	SR	SPW	SPL	SPR	Qualification
1	France	3	3	0	9	9	1	9.000	245	187	1.310	2017 European Championship
2	Estonia	3	2	1	6	7	4	1.750	246	250	0.984	
3	Switzerland	3	1	2	2	4	8	0.500	242	272	0.890	
4	Slovenia	3	0	3	1	2	9	0.222	223	247	0.903	

Date	Time		Score		Set 1	Set 2	Set 3	Set 4	Set 5	Total	Report
13 Jan	17:00	Estonia	3–0	Slovenia	25–22	25–23	25–22			75–67	Report
13 Jan	20:00	France	3–0	Switzerland	25–22	25–18	25–17			75–57	Report
14 Jan	15:00	Slovenia	2–3	Switzerland	25–17	25–15	21–25	17–25	9–15	97–97	Report
14 Jan	18:00	Estonia	1–3	France	20–25	17–25	9–25	20–25		66–100	Report
15 Jan	15:00	Switzerland	1–3	Estonia	25–27	25–23	17–25	21–25		88–100	Report
15 Jan	18:00	Slovenia	0–3	France	19–25	19–25	21–25			59–75	Report

=== Pool E ===
Pos	Team	Pld	W	L	Pts	SW	SL	SR	SPW	SPL	SPR	Qualification
1	Romania	3	3	0	8	9	2	4.500	254	193	1.316	2017 European Championship
2	Belgium	3	2	1	7	8	3	2.667	258	200	1.290	2017 European Championship
3	Portugal	3	1	2	3	3	6	0.500	182	191	0.953	
4	Iceland	3	0	3	0	0	9	0.000	115	225	0.511	

Date	Time		Score		Set 1	Set 2	Set 3	Set 4	Set 5	Total	Report
12 Jan	15:00	Iceland	0–3	Portugal	11–25	16–25	15–25			42–75	Report
12 Jan	17:30	Romania	3–2	Belgium	18–25	25–22	25–23	21–25	15–13	104–108	Report
13 Jan	20:00	Belgium	3–0	Iceland	25–15	25–14	25–15			75–44	Report
14 Jan	17:30	Portugal	0–3	Belgium	17–25	13–25	22–25			52–75	Report
14 Jan	20:00	Romania	3–0	Iceland	25–14	25–6	25–10			75–30	Report
15 Jan	20:00	Portugal	0–3	Romania	17–25	19–25	19–25			55–75	Report

=== Pool F ===
Pos	Team	Pld	W	L	Pts	SW	SL	SR	SPW	SPL	SPR	Qualification
1	Italy	3	3	0	8	9	2	4.500	258	201	1.284	2017 European Championship
2	Germany	3	2	1	7	8	3	2.667	250	197	1.269	
3	Croatia	3	1	2	2	3	8	0.375	196	256	0.766	
4	Ukraine	3	0	3	1	2	9	0.222	198	248	0.798	

Date	Time		Score		Set 1	Set 2	Set 3	Set 4	Set 5	Total	Report
13 Jan	17:00	Croatia	0–3	Germany	9–25	22–25	15–25			46–75	Report
13 Jan	19::30	Italy	3–0	Ukraine	25–22	25–17	25–10			75–49	Report
14 Jan	17:00	Germany	3–0	Ukraine	25–15	25–10	25–18			75–43	Report
14 Jan	19:30	Croatia	0–3	Italy	18–25	13–25	21–25			52–75	Report
15 Jan	15:00	Ukraine	2–3	Croatia	20–25	25–13	18–25	25–25	11–15	99–103	Report
15 Jan	17:30	Germany	2–3	Italy	16–25	25–21	22–25	25–22	12–15	100–108	Report

=== Pool G ===
Pos	Team	Pld	W	L	Pts	SW	SL	SR	SPW	SPL	SPR	Qualification
1	Bulgaria	3	3	0	9	9	1	9.000	249	197	1.264	2017 European Championship
2	Belarus	3	2	1	5	6	5	1.200	256	215	1.191	
3	Denmark	3	1	2	4	6	6	1.000	252	247	1.020	
4	Georgia	3	0	3	0	0	9	0.000	127	225	0.564	

Date	Time		Score		Set 1	Set 2	Set 3	Set 4	Set 5	Total	Report
12 Jan	15:00	Belarus	3–0	Georgia	25–13	25–14	25–21			75–48	Report
12 Jan	17:30	Denmark	1–3	Bulgaria	25–18	28–30	13–25	20–25		86–98	Report
13 Jan	15:00	Georgia	0–3	Denmark	10–25	15–25	13–25			38–75	Report
14 Jan	17:30	Bulgaria	3–0	Georgia	25–14	25–11	25–16			75–41	Report
14 Jan	20:00	Belarus	3–2	Denmark	23–25	23–25	25–16	25–18	15–7	111–91	Report
15 Jan	20:00	Bulgaria	3–0	Belarus	25–23	26–24	25–23			76–70	Report

=== Pool H ===
Pos	Team	Pld	W	L	Pts	SW	SL	SR	SPW	SPL	SPR	Qualification
1	Finland	2	2	0	6	6	0	MAX	150	101	1.485	2017 European Championship
2	Austria	2	1	1	3	3	3	1.000	127	144	0.882	
3	Norway	2	0	2	0	0	6	0.000	120	152	0.789	

Date	Time		Score		Set 1	Set 2	Set 3	Set 4	Set 5	Total	Report
13 Jan	17:30	Austria	3–0	Norway	25–23	25–21	27–25			77–69	Report
14 Jan	17:30	Norway	0–3	Finland	19–25	17–25	15–25			51–75	Report
15 Jan	15:30	Finland	3–0	Austria	25–16	25–19	25–15			75–50	Report

=== Ranking of the second placed teams ===
There was a pool which competed with three teams while the others had four teams. So, the result of fourth placed teams of each pools would be cut off before consider the qualified teams.

Pos	Team	Pld	W	L	Pts	SW	SL	SR	SPW	SPL	SPR	Qualification
1	Czech Republic	2	1	1	4	5	3	1.667	180	148	1.216	2017 European Championship
2	Belgium	2	1	1	4	5	3	1.667	183	156	1.173	2017 European Championship
3	Germany	2	1	1	4	5	3	1.667	175	154	1.136	
4	Serbia	2	1	1	3	3	3	1.000	141	144	0.979	
5	Estonia	2	1	1	3	4	4	1.000	171	183	0.934	
6	Austria	2	1	1	3	3	3	1.000	127	144	0.882	
7	Belarus	2	1	1	2	3	5	0.600	181	167	1.084	
8	Spain	2	0	2	1	2	6	0.333	168	186	0.903	
