= 2018 Boys' U18 Volleyball European Championship Qualification =

This is an article about qualification for the 2018 Boys' U18 Volleyball European Championship.

== Qualification summary ==
- Belarus
- Belgium
- Bulgaria
- Czech Republic
- France
- Germany
- Greece
- Italy
- Russia
- Slovakia
- Turkey
- Ukraine

== Pool standing procedure ==
1. Number of matches won
2. Match points
3. Sets ratio
4. Points ratio
5. Result of the last match between the tied teams

Match won 3–0 or 3–1: 3 match points for the winner, 0 match points for the loser
Match won 3–2: 2 match points for the winner, 1 match point for the loser

== Direct qualification ==
Host countries, Czech Republic and Slovakia, qualified for final round directly.

== Qualification ==
The winners of each pools and the best three second placed teams qualified for final round.

- Pools composition

Pool A	Pool B	Pool C	Pool D	Pool E	Pool F	Pool G
Greece	Turkey	Italy	Belarus	Bulgaria	Russia	Belgium
Spain	Ukraine	Finland	Serbia	Netherlands	Poland	Estonia
Latvia	Hungary	Denmark	Romania	France	Cyprus	Germany
Portugal	Georgia	Switzerland	Israel	Sweden	Slovenia	Austria

=== Pool A ===
Pos	Team	Pld	W	L	Pts	SW	SL	SR	SPW	SPL	SPR	Qualification
1	Greece	3	3	0	9	9	1	9.000	247	182	1.357	2018 European Championship
2	Portugal	3	2	1	6	6	5	1.200	245	254	0.965	
3	Latvia	3	1	2	3	5	6	0.833	232	252	0.921	
4	Spain	3	0	3	0	1	9	0.111	222	258	0.860	

Date	Time		Score		Set 1	Set 2	Set 3	Set 4	Set 5	Total	Report
5 Jan	15:00	Latvia	3–0	Spain	25–19	28–26	25–22			78–67	
5 Jan	17:30	Greece	3–0	Portugal	25–15	25–21	25–16			75–52	
6 Jan	15:00	Spain	1–3	Portugal	22–25	25–21	32–34	18–25		97–105	
6 Jan	17:30	Latvia	1–3	Greece	15–25	25–22	14–25	18–25		72–97	
7 Jan	14:00	Portugal	3–1	Latvia	25–21	25–21	13–25	25–15		88–82	
7 Jan	16:30	Spain	0–3	Greece	19–25	21–25	18–25			58–75	

=== Pool B ===
Pos	Team	Pld	W	L	Pts	SW	SL	SR	SPW	SPL	SPR	Qualification
1	Turkey	3	3	0	9	9	0	MAX	225	137	1.642	2018 European Championship
2	Ukraine	3	2	1	6	6	3	2.000	199	177	1.124	2018 European Championship
3	Hungary	3	1	2	3	3	6	0.500	187	193	0.969	
4	Georgia	3	0	3	0	0	9	0.000	121	225	0.538	

Date	Time		Score		Set 1	Set 2	Set 3	Set 4	Set 5	Total	Report
4 Jan	17:30	Georgia	0–3	Ukraine	15–25	13–25	12–25			40–75	
4 Jan	20:00	Turkey	3–0	Hungary	25–23	25–12	25–15			75–50	
5 Jan	17:30	Ukraine	3–0	Hungary	25–20	25–21	25–21			75–62	
5 Jan	20:00	Georgia	0–3	Turkey	10–25	15–25	13–25			38–75	
6 Jan	17:30	Ukraine	0–3	Turkey	16–25	16–25	17–25			49–75	
6 Jan	20:00	Hungary	3–0	Georgia	25–19	25–11	25–13			75–43	

=== Pool C ===
Pos	Team	Pld	W	L	Pts	SW	SL	SR	SPW	SPL	SPR	Qualification
1	Italy	3	3	0	9	9	0	MAX	225	137	1.642	2018 European Championship
2	Finland	3	2	1	6	6	4	1.500	210	200	1.050	
3	Switzerland	3	1	2	3	4	6	0.667	206	230	0.896	
4	Denmark	3	0	3	0	0	9	0.000	153	227	0.674	

Date	Time		Score		Set 1	Set 2	Set 3	Set 4	Set 5	Total	Report
4 Jan	16:00	Switzerland	1–3	Finland	14–25	21–25	25–16	18–25		78–91	Report
4 Jan	18:30	Italy	3–0	Denmark	25–17	25–13	25–12			75–42	Report
5 Jan	16:00	Finland	3–0	Denmark	25–19	25–18	25–10			75–47	Report
5 Jan	18:30	Switzerland	0–3	Italy	17–25	15–25	19–25			51–75	Report
6 Jan	16:00	Denmark	0–3	Switzerland	20–25	19–25	25–27			64–77	Report
6 Jan	18:30	Finland	0–3	Italy	13–25	14–25	17–25			44–75	Report

=== Pool D ===
Pos	Team	Pld	W	L	Pts	SW	SL	SR	SPW	SPL	SPR	Qualification
1	Belarus	3	3	0	9	9	0	MAX	225	143	1.573	2018 European Championship
2	Serbia	3	2	1	6	6	5	1.200	238	229	1.039	
3	Romania	3	1	2	3	4	6	0.667	214	236	0.907	
4	Israel	3	0	3	0	1	9	0.111	178	247	0.721	

Date	Time		Score		Set 1	Set 2	Set 3	Set 4	Set 5	Total	Report
4 Jan	15:00	Israel	1–3	Serbia	11–25	18–25	25–20	17–25		71–95	Report
4 Jan	17:30	Romania	0–3	Belarus	16–25	15–25	23–25			54–75	Report
5 Jan	20:00	Belarus	3–0	Israel	25–13	25–14	25–16			75–43	Report
6 Jan	17:30	Serbia	0–3	Belarus	9–25	21–25	16–25			46–75	Report
6 Jan	20:00	Romania	3–0	Israel	25–20	25–19	27–25			77–64	Report
7 Jan	20:00	Serbia	3–1	Romania	25–20	25–17	22–25	25–21		97–83	Report

=== Pool E ===
Pos	Team	Pld	W	L	Pts	SW	SL	SR	SPW	SPL	SPR	Qualification
1	Bulgaria	3	3	0	9	9	1	9.000	248	199	1.246	2018 European Championship
2	France	3	2	1	6	6	3	2.000	214	187	1.144	2018 European Championship
3	Netherlands	3	1	2	3	4	6	0.667	216	228	0.947	
4	Sweden	3	0	3	0	0	9	0.000	161	225	0.716	

Date	Time		Score		Set 1	Set 2	Set 3	Set 4	Set 5	Total	Report
5 Jan	16:00	Sweden	0–3	France	16–25	17–25	19–25			52–75	
5 Jan	18:30	Bulgaria	3–1	Netherlands	22–25	25–20	25–18	25–19		97–82	
6 Jan	16:00	France	3–0	Netherlands	25–21	25–17	25–21			75–59	
6 Jan	18:30	Sweden	0–3	Bulgaria	15–25	18–25	20–25			53–75	
7 Jan	16:00	Netherlands	3–0	Sweden	25–17	25–22	25–17			75–56	
7 Jan	18:30	France	0–3	Bulgaria	20–25	20–25	24–26			64–76	

=== Pool F ===
Pos	Team	Pld	W	L	Pts	SW	SL	SR	SPW	SPL	SPR	Qualification
1	Russia	3	3	0	9	9	0	MAX	225	169	1.331	2018 European Championship
2	Poland	3	2	1	6	6	4	1.500	233	212	1.099	
3	Slovenia	3	1	2	3	4	6	0.667	226	230	0.983	
4	Cyprus	3	0	3	0	0	9	0.000	155	228	0.680	

Date	Time		Score		Set 1	Set 2	Set 3	Set 4	Set 5	Total	Report
4 Jan	17:30	Poland	3–1	Slovenia	25–17	22–25	25–21	25–21		97–84	Report
4 Jan	20:00	Cyprus	0–3	Russia	14–25	20–25	10–25			44–75	Report
5 Jan	17:30	Slovenia	0–3	Russia	23–25	18–25	23–25			64–75	Report
5 Jan	20:00	Poland	3–0	Cyprus	25–16	25–16	25–21			75–53	Report
6 Jan	17:30	Russia	3–0	Poland	25–18	25–20	25–23			75–61	Report
6 Jan	20:00	Slovenia	3–0	Cyprus	28–26	25–12	25–20			78–58	Report

=== Pool G ===
Pos	Team	Pld	W	L	Pts	SW	SL	SR	SPW	SPL	SPR	Qualification
1	Belgium	3	3	0	9	9	1	9.000	252	198	1.273	2018 European Championship
2	Germany	3	2	1	6	7	3	2.333	238	195	1.221	2018 European Championship
3	Estonia	3	1	2	3	3	6	0.500	201	223	0.901	
4	Austria	3	0	3	0	0	9	0.000	155	230	0.674	

Date	Time		Score		Set 1	Set 2	Set 3	Set 4	Set 5	Total	Report
4 Jan	20:00	Germany	3–0	Austria	25–14	25–16	25–11			75–41	
5 Jan	17:30	Austria	0–3	Belgium	18–25	11–25	18–25			47–75	
5 Jan	20:00	Estonia	0–3	Germany	25–27	17–25	14–25			56–77	
6 Jan	17:30	Belgium	3–0	Estonia	25–19	29–27	25–19			79–65	
7 Jan	14:30	Austria	0–3	Estonia	22–25	28–30	17–25			67–80	
7 Jan	20:00	Belgium	3–1	Germany	23–25	25–18	25–23	25–20		98–86	

=== Ranking of the second rank teams ===
Pos	Team	Pld	W	L	Pts	SW	SL	SR	SPW	SPL	SPR	Qualification
1	Germany	3	2	1	6	7	3	2.333	238	195	1.221	2018 European Championship
2	Ukraine	3	2	1	6	6	3	2.000	199	177	1.124	2018 European Championship
3	France	3	2	1	6	6	3	2.000	214	187	1.144	2018 European Championship
4	Poland	3	2	1	6	6	4	1.500	233	212	1.099	
5	Finland	3	2	1	6	6	4	1.500	210	200	1.050	
6	Portugal	3	2	1	6	6	5	1.200	245	254	0.965	
7	Serbia	3	2	1	6	6	5	1.200	238	229	1.039	
