= Lukáš Vašina =

Czech volleyball player (born 1999)

Personal information
- Born: 6 July 1999 (age 27); Ústí nad Orlicí, Czech Republic
- Height: 1.96 m (6 ft 5 in)
- Weight: 86 kg (190 lb)
- Spike: 350 cm (138 in)
- Block: 330 cm (130 in)

Volleyball information
- Position: Outside hitter

Career
Years	Teams
2018–2022; 2022–2023; 2023–2024; 2024–2026	ČEZ Karlovarsko; Skra Bełchatów; GKS Katowice; Asseco Resovia

National team
Czech Republic
Honours
Men's volleyball
Representing Czech Republic
European League
Bronze medal – third place	2024 Osijek

Lukáš Vašina (born 6 July 1999) is a Czech professional volleyball player who plays as an outside hitter for the Czech Republic national team.

== Personal life ==
His father, Lubomír, is a volleyball coach.

== Honours ==
=== Club ===
- CEV Cup
  - 2024–25 – with Asseco Resovia
- Domestic
  - 2020–21 Czech Championship, with ČEZ Karlovarsko
  - 2021–22 Czech SuperCup, with ČEZ Karlovarsko
  - 2021–22 Czech Championship, with ČEZ Karlovarsko

=== Youth national team ===
- 2017 CEV U19 European Championship
- 2018 CEV U20 European Championship
