= Jan Kozamernik =

Slovenian volleyball player (born 1995)

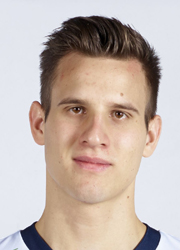

Personal information
- Nationality: Slovenian
- Born: 24 December 1995 (age 30) Ljubljana, Slovenia
- Height: 2.05 m (6 ft 9 in)
- Weight: 100 kg (220 lb)
- Spike: 358 cm (141 in)
- Block: 336 cm (132 in)

Volleyball information
- Position: Middle blocker
- Current club: Tokyo Great Bears

Career
- Years: Team
- 2014–2017 2017–2018 2018–2021 2021–2023 2023–2025 2025–: ACH Volley; Diatec Trentino; Power Volley Milano; Asseco Resovia; Trentino Volley; Tokyo Great Bears

National team
- Years: Team
- 2014–: Slovenia
Honours
Men's volleyball
Representing Slovenia
FIVB Nations League
Bronze medal – third place	2026 China
FIVB Challenger Cup
Gold medal – first place	2019 Slovenia
CEV European Championship
Silver medal – second place	2015 Bulgaria/Italy
Silver medal – second place	2019 France/Slovenia/Belgium/Netherlands
Silver medal – second place	2021 Poland/Czech Republic/Estonia/Finland
Bronze medal – third place	2023 Italy/Bulgaria/North Macedonia/Israel
European League
Gold medal – first place	2015 Poland

Jan Kozamernik (born 24 December 1995) is a Slovenian volleyball player who plays for Japanese club Tokyo Great Bears and the Slovenia national team. With Slovenia, he was the runner-up of the European Volleyball Championship three times, in 2015, 2019 and 2021. He also represented Slovenia at the 2024 Summer Olympics.

== Honours ==
=== Club ===
- Continental
  - 2020–21 CEV Challenge Cup – with Allianz Powervolley Milano
- Domestic
  - 2014–15 Slovenian Cup, with ACH Volley
  - 2014–15 Slovenian Championship, with ACH Volley
  - 2015–16 Slovenian Championship, with ACH Volley
  - 2016–17 Slovenian Championship, with ACH Volley

=== Individual awards ===
- 2019: CEV European Championship – Best middle blocker
- 2025: FIVB Nations League – Best middle blocker
