= Patrik Indra =

Czech volleyball player (born 1997)

Personal information
- Born: 8 December 1997 (age 28); Jihlava, Czech Republic
- Height: 2.00 m (6 ft 7 in)
- Weight: 93 kg (205 lb)

Volleyball information
- Position: Opposite
- Current club: Norwid Częstochowa
- Number: 23

Career
Years	Teams
2015–2017; 2017–2018; 2018–2019; 2019–2020; 2020–2022; 2022–2024; 2024–	VK Choceň; Dukla Liberec; VK Benátky nad Jizerou; Dukla Liberec; VK Karlovarsko; Chaumont VB 52; Norwid Częstochowa

National team
Czech Republic
Honours
Men's volleyball
Representing Czech Republic
European League
Gold medal – first place	2022 Croatia
Bronze medal – third place	2024 Osijek

Patrik Indra (born 8 December 1997) is a Czech professional volleyball player who plays as an opposite spiker for Norwid Częstochowa and the Czech Republic national team.

== Honours ==
=== Club ===
- Domestic
  - 2017–18 Czech Cup, with Dukla Liberec
  - 2020–21 Czech Championship, with ČEZ Karlovarsko
  - 2021–22 Czech SuperCup, with ČEZ Karlovarsko
  - 2021–22 Czech Championship, with ČEZ Karlovarsko
