= List of naturalized sportspeople of Turkey national teams =

List of Turkish international sportspeople born abroad

This List of naturalized sportspeople of Turkey national teams contains foreign sportspeople, who were admitted to Turkey national teams following their naturalization as citizen of Turkey, and competed at international official competitions for Turkey.

== Regulations ==
There are rules and regulations that must be followed regarding the recruitment of athletes or the athletes who will represent the countries in competitions. Although the laws governing acquiring citizenship in another country vary from country to country, the regulations that must be followed in competitions organized worldwide are the same for every country.

Regarding the nationality of the competitors, following four main provisions are stated in Rule 41 published by the International Olympic Committee (IOC) in the Olympic Charter:

1- An athlete holding citizenship in two or more countries may only choose one country and compete for that country. However, if the athlete acquires or changes citizenship after representing a country at an Olympic, continental, or regional championship or game, they may not represent another country unless they meet the requirements in Article 2.

2- When an athlete representing a country acquires citizenship in the Olympics, continental and regional championships, or games recognized by international federations, a minimum of three years must pass from the Games or Championships in which they represented their previous country before they can represent their country at the Olympic Games. However, this period may be reduced or canceled for individuals on a case-by-case basis by decision of the IOC Executive Board, with the approval of the National Olympic Committees (NOCs) or International Federations (IFs).

3- If a state, province, overseas territory, country, or colony declares independence, joins or merges with another country, or if that country's new National Olympic Committee is recognized by the IOC, an athlete may represent their country. However, if the athlete chooses to represent a new National Olympic Committee, they may choose to do so only once.

4- Beyond this, whether an athlete qualified to play in the Olympic Games represents a country other than their own or chooses to represent another country, the IOC has the authority to make all kinds of decisions on matters such as nationality, citizenship, and residence, either generally or individually.

According to the nternational Association of Athletics Federations' (IAAF) 2016-2017 International Competition Rules (Rule 5):

a) An athlete who has never participated in an international competition and acquires another country's citizenship cannot compete in international competitions on behalf of another country for one year. However, this one-year period may be cancelled or reduced.

b) An athlete who has previously participated in competitions and acquires another country's citizenship must pass a minimum of three years before they can represent their country. However, this three-year period may be cancelled or reduced (according to the decision of the IAAF Committee). The rules for dual citizenship are identical to those of the IOC.

In team sports like football and basketball, the rules for competing for another country are even stricter. According to the Fédération Internationale de Football Association (FIFA) and the International Basketball Federation (FIBA), if an athete has competed for one country in an official elite-level match, they are not permitted to compete for another country (FIBA, 2017; FIFA, 2015). This rule is also called "play-stay" in English.

While Turkey follows the aforementioned ules for recruiting athletes in international organizations, it also applies its own country's rules regarding acquiring Turkish citizenship to these athletes. The rules regarding acquiring Turkish citizenship are determined in accordance with the regulation "Regarding the Implementation of the Turkish Citizenship Law" issued by a cree dated 6 April 2010.

== Reasons ==
Recruited athletes are generally selected from athletes who have previously achieved success in sports or have a high potential for success. Reasons for acquiring citizenship include family reasons (marriage, having a parent who is a citizen of another country), economic difficulties in their home country, seeking financial income, obtaining a better education, improving training opportunities, or because their home country has a high number of successful athletes and is unable to compete in the Olympic Games.

== Archery ==
| G | Name | Country of Origin | Birth name | Birth date and Age | Period | Ref. |
|---|---|---|---|---|---|---|
| F | Derya Bard Sarıaltın | UKR | Svana Bard | 14 May 1977 (age 49) | 2005–2006 | |
| F | Natalia Nasaridze | GEO | Natalia Nasaridze | 2 October 1972 (age 53) | 1996– | |

== Athletics ==
| G | Name | Country of Origin | Birth name | Birth date and Age | Period | Ref. |
|---|---|---|---|---|---|---|
| F | Elvan Abeylegesse | ETH | Hewan Abeye | 11 September 1982 (age 44) | 1999–2013 | |
| F | Meryem Akda | KEN | Mirriam Jepchirchir Maiyo | 5 August 1992 (age 34) | 2017 | |
| F | Oksana Andrusina-Mert | RUS | Oksana Andrusina | 26 March 1973 (age 53) | 1999–2013 | |
| F | Anzhela Kinet | BLR | Anzhela Atroshchenko | 14 November 1970 (age 55) | 2001–2005 | |
| M | Emre Zafer Barnes | JAM | Winston Barnes | 7 November 1988 (age 37) | 2004–2021 | |
| F | Alemitu Bekele Degfa | ETH | Alemitu Bekele Degfa | 17 September 1977 (age 49) | 2009 | |
| F | Yasemin Can | KEN | Vivian Jemutai | 11 December 1996 (age 29) | 2016–2024 | |
| F | Yasmani Copello | CUB | Yasmani Copello Escobar | 15 April 1987 (age 39) | 2014–2018 | |
| F | Mirela Dulgheru-Renda | ROU | Mirela Dulgheru | 5 October 1966 (age 59) | 2000 | |
| F | Meryem Erdoğan | ETH | Mariam Hana Dingo | 24 April 1990 (age 36) | 2009–2010 | |
| M | Mert Girmalegesse | ETH | Shimelis Girma | 30 November 1987 (age 38) | 2008–2009 | |
| M | Ali Ferit Gören | AUT | Alfred König | 2 October 1913–1987 | 1938–1939 | |
| F | Ekaterina Guliyev | RUS | Ekaterina Zavyalova | 1 March 1991 (age 35) | 2012–2015 | |
| M | Ramil Guliyev | AZE | Ramil Eldar oğlu Quliyev | May 29, 1990 (age 36) | 2013– | |
| M | Jak Ali Harvey | JAM | Jacques Montgomery Harvey | 4 May 1989 (age 37) | 2016–2022 | |
| F | Sultan Haydar | ETH | Chaltu Girma Meshesha | 23 May 1987 (age 39) | 2009 | |
| F | Nora Ivanova-Güner | BUL | Nora Ivanova | 1 June 1977 (age 49) | 2001 | |
| F | Ebru Kavaklıoğlu | RUS | Yelena Kopytova | 14 March 1970 (age 56) | 1999–2001 | |
| M | Ali Kaya | KEN | Stanley Kiprotich Mukche | 20 April 1994 (age 32) | 2013–2017 | |
| M | Aras Kaya | KEN | Amos Kibitok | 4 April 1994 (age 32) | 2016–2022 | |
| M | Polat Kemboi Arıkan | KEN | Paul Kipkosgei Kemboi | 12 December 1990 (age 35) | 2012–2016 | |
| M | Mohammad Khalvandi | IRI | Mohammad Khalvandi | 11 January 1990 (age 36) | 2021–20124 | |
| M | Kaan Kigen Özbilen | KEN | Mike Kigen | 15 January 1986 (age 40) | 2015 | |
| M | Tarık Langat Akdağ | KEN | Patrick Kipkirui Langat | 18 June 1988 (age 38) | 2012–2018 | |
| F | Karin Melis Mey | RSA | Karin Mey | 31 May 1983 (age 43) | 2009–2012 | |
| F | Svetla Mitkova-Sınırtaş | BUL | Svetla Ivanova Mitkova | 17 June 1964 (age 62) | 1999 | |
| M | Şeref Osmanoğlu | UKR | Sheryf El-Sheryf | 2 January 1989 (age 37) | 2016 | |
| F | Tatyana Polnova | RUS | Tatyana Zaykova | 20 April 1979 (age 47) | 1998 | |
| F | Sviatlana Sudak | BLR | Sviatlana Sudak | 20 March 1971 (age 55) | 2007 | |
| M | Hillary Yego | KEN | Hillary Kipsang Yego | 2 April 1992 (age 34) | 2020 | |

== Badminton ==
| G | Name | Country of Origin | Birth name | Birth date and Age | Period | Ref. |
|---|---|---|---|---|---|---|
| F | Aprilsasi Putri Lejarsar Variella | INA | Aprilsasi Putri Lejarsar Variella | 6 April 1990 (age 36) | | |

== Basketball ==
| G | Name | Country of Origin | Birth name | Birth date and Age | Period | Ref. |
|---|---|---|---|---|---|---|
| M | Tarik Biberović | BIH | Tarik Biberović | 28 January 2001 (age 25) | 2024- | |
| F | Beren Burke | USA | Kennedy Burke | 14 February 1997 (age 29) | 2026- | |
| M | Adem Bona | NGA | Ikechukwu Stanley Okoro | 28 March 2003 (age 23) | 2025- | |
| M | Ali Muhammed | USA | Bobby Dixon | 10 April 1983 (age 43) | 2015–2018 | |
| F | Korel Engin | USA | Cori Enghusen | 8 April 1980 (age 46) | 2005–2007 | |
| M | Malachi Flynn | USA | Malachi Flynn | 9 May 1998 (age 28) | 2026– | |
| F | Kuanitra Holingsvorth | USA | Quanitra Hollingsworth | 15 November 1988 (age 37) | 2012–2023 | |
| M | Shane Larkin | USA | Shane Larkin | 2 October 1992 (age 33) | 2020-2022 | |
| M | Melih Mahmutoğlu | SRB | Melih Brničanin | 12 May 1990 (age 36) | 2006- | |
| F | Teaira Mccovan | USA | Teaira McCowan | 28 September 1996 (age 29) | 2022- | |
| F | Nevin Newlin | USA | Kristen Newlin | 8 May 1985 (age 41) | 2009–2011 | |
| M | Cedi Osman | MKD | Cedi Osman | 8 April 1995 (age 31) | 2011- | |
| M | Ercan Osmani | ALB | Erxhan Osmani | 4 August 1998 (age 28) | 2022- | |
| M | Emir Preldžić | BIH | Emir Preldžić | 6 September 1987 (age 39) | 2011–2014 | |
| F | LaToya Sanders | USA | LaToya Sanders | 11 September 1986 (age 40) | 2014–2017 | |
| F | Kiah Stokes | USA | Kiah Stokes | 30 March 1993 (age 33) | 2019-2021 | |
| M | Scottie Wilbekin | USA | Scottie Wilbekin | 5 April 1993 (age 33) | 2018–2023 | |
| F | Nevriye Yılmaz | BUL | Nevriye Yılmaz | 16 June 1980 (age 46) | 2005–2016 | |

== Cycling ==
| G | Name | Country of Origin | Birth name | Birth date and Age | Period | Ref. |
|---|---|---|---|---|---|---|
| M | Mehmet Şampiyonbisiklet | FRA | Gabriel Muller | 12 April 1985 (age 41) | 2023- | |

== Fencing ==
| G | Name | Country of Origin | Birth name | Birth date and Age | Period | Ref. |
|---|---|---|---|---|---|---|
| M | Martino Minuto | ITA | Martino Minuto | 7 April 1988 (age 38) | 2014– | |
| F | Iryna Shchukla Çiçek | UKR | Iryna Shchukla | 13 October 1995 (age 30) | 2016– | |

== Football ==
| G | Name | Country of Origin | Birth name | Birth date and Age | Period | Ref. |
|---|---|---|---|---|---|---|
| M | Mehmet Aurélio | BRA | Marco Aurélio Brito dos Prazeres | 15 December 1977 (age 48) | 2006–2011 | |
| M | Ferdi Kadıoğlu | NED | Ferdi Kadıoğlu | 7 October 1999 (age 26) | 2025– | |
| M | Emre Mor | DEN | Emre Mor | 24 July 1997 (age 29) | 2016–2017 | |

== Gymnastics ==
| G | Name | Country of Origin | Birth name | Birth date and Age | Period | Ref. |
|---|---|---|---|---|---|---|
| M | Adem Asil | EGY | Abdelrahman Elgamal | 4 July 1988 (age 38) | 2020- | |

== Handball ==
| G | Name | Country of Origin | Birth name | Birth date and Age | Period | Ref. |
|---|---|---|---|---|---|---|
| F | Olha Vashchuk | UKR | Olha Vashchuk | 13 August 1987 (age 39) | 2014- | |

== Ice hockey ==
| G | Name | Country of Origin | Birth name | Birth date and Age | Period | Ref. |
|---|---|---|---|---|---|---|
| M | Feyzi Ahsen-Böre | RUS | Feyzi Ahsen-Böre | 25 August 1917–1975 | 1940s | |

== Ice skating ==
| G | Name | Country of Origin | Birth name | Birth date and Age | Period | Ref. |
|---|---|---|---|---|---|---|
| F | Alisa Besseghier | UKR | Alisa Alexandrovna Agafonova | 15 January 1991 (age 35) | 2010-2016 | |
| F | Katarina DelCamp | USA | Katarina DelCamp | 20 June 2004 (age 22) | 2024- | |

== Judo ==
| G | Name | Country of Origin | Birth name | Birth date and Age | Period | Ref. |
|---|---|---|---|---|---|---|
| F | Kayra Özdemir | FRA | Ketty Mathé | 13 February 1988 (age 38) | 2016- | |
| M | Mikail Özerler | SLO | Mihael Žgank | 1 February 1994 (age 32) | 2019-2024 | |
| M | Bekir Özlü | GEO | Betkil Shukvani | 30 August 1988 (age 38) | 2016-2018 | |

== Kayaking ==
| G | Name | Country of Origin | Birth name | Birth date and Age | Period | Ref. |
|---|---|---|---|---|---|---|
| F | Lasma Liepa | LAT | Lasma Liepa | 4 July 1988 (age 38) | 2016- | |
| F | Tamara Takács | HUN | Tamara Takács | 1997 (age 28–29) | 2024- | |

== Kickboxing ==
| G | Name | Country of Origin | Birth name | Birth date and Age | Period | Ref. |
|---|---|---|---|---|---|---|
| M | Zamig Athakishiyev | AZE | Zamig Athakishiyev | 28 June 1986 (age 40) | | |

== Speed skating ==
| G | Name | Country of Origin | Birth name | Birth date and Age | Period | Ref. |
|---|---|---|---|---|---|---|
| M | Denis Örs | RUS | Denis Bunyaminovich Ors | 28 April 2005 (age 21) | 2021- | |

== Swimming ==
| G | Name | Country of Origin | Birth name | Birth date and Age | Period | Ref. |
|---|---|---|---|---|---|---|
| M | Demir Atasoy | UKR | Dmitry Cherkasov | 26 May 1987 (age 39) | 2013-2017 | |
| F | Ekaterina Avramova | BUL | Ekaterina Avramova | 12 November 1991 (age 34) | 2017- | |
| F | Viktoria Zeynep Güneş | UKR | Viktoria Solntseva | 19 June 1998 (age 28) | 2013-2022 | |
| F | Yasemin Rosenberger | GER | Jasmin Rosenberger | 16 October 1985 (age 40) | 2009-2012 | |

== Table tennis ==
| G | Name | Country of Origin | Birth name | Birth date and Age | Period | Ref. |
|---|---|---|---|---|---|---|
| F | Melek Hu | CHN | Hou Meiling | 27 January 1989 (age 37) | 2009-2016 | |
| M | Ahmet Li | CHN | Lǐ Liángfū | 12 January 1991 (age 35) | 2013 | |
| M | Cem Zeng | CHN | Zheng Changgong | 21 October 1985 (age 40) | 2008 | |

== Triathlon ==
| G | Name | Country of Origin | Birth name | Birth date and Age | Period | Ref. |
|---|---|---|---|---|---|---|
| F | Sinem Francisca Tous Servera | ESP | Xisca Tous Servera | 30 June 1992 (age 34) | 2025- | |

== Volleyball ==
| G | Name | Country of Origin | Birth name | Birth date and Age | Period | Ref. |
|---|---|---|---|---|---|---|
| F | Meliha İsmailoğlu | BIH | Meliha Smajlović | 17 September 1993 (age 33) | 2017- | |
| F | Aleksia Karutasu | ROU | Alexia Căruțașu | 10 June 2003 (age 23) | 2025- | |
| F | Sinead Jack Kısal | TRI | Sinead Jack | 8 November 1993 (age 32) | 2025- | |
| M | Mirza Lagumdžija | BIH | Mirza Lagumdžija | 18 May 2001 (age 25) | 2021- | |
| M | Adis Lagumdžija | BIH | Adis Lagumdžija | 29 March 1999 (age 27) | 2018- | |
| M | Mert Matić | BIH | Mert Matić | 22 May 1995 (age 31) | 2023- | |
| F | Liza Safronova | KAZ | Liza Safronova | 17 January 2006 (age 20) | 2024- | |
| F | Melissa Vargas | CUB | Meliissa Vargas | 18 October 1999 (age 26) | 2023- | |

== Weightlifting ==
| G | Name | Country of Origin | Birth name | Birth date and Age | Period | Ref. |
|---|---|---|---|---|---|---|
| M | Halil Mutlu | BUL | Halil Aliev | 14 July 1973 (age 53) | 1991-2005 | |
| M | Hafız Süleymanoğlu | BUL | Hafız Süleymanov | 23 January 1967 (age 59) | 1991-1997 | |
| M | Naim Süleymanoğlu | BUL | Naum Shalamanov | 3 January 1967–18 November 2017 | 1988-1996 | |

== Wrestling ==
| G | Name | Country of Origin | Birth name | Birth date and Age | Period | Ref. |
|---|---|---|---|---|---|---|
| M | Ramazan Şahin | RUS | Ramzan Irbaikhanov | 8 July 1983 (age 43) | 2007-2008 | |
| M | Selim Yaşar | RUS | Koloi Mikailovich Kartoev | 20 February 1990 (age 36) | 2014-2021 | |
| F | Elif Jale Yeşilırmak | RUS | Yulia Guramievna Rekvava | 30 July 1986 (age 40) | 2012-2020 | |
