= Iran men's national volleyball team results =

The following are the Iran men's national volleyball team results at FIVB sanctioned tournaments such as Olympic Games, World Championship, World Cup, World Grand Champions Cup and Nations League (formerly World League).

== Olympic Games ==
=== 2016 ===
#	Opponent	Result	Host city	Date	Round
1	Argentina	0–3 (23–25, 24–26, 18–25)	(Brazil) Rio de Janeiro	7 August	Preliminary round Pool B
2	Poland	2–3 (17–25, 23–25, 25–23, 25–20, 16–18)	(Brazil) Rio de Janeiro	9 August	Preliminary round Pool B
3	Cuba	3–0 (25–21, 31–29, 25–16)	(Brazil) Rio de Janeiro	11 August	Preliminary round Pool B
4	Egypt	3–0 (28–26, 25–22, 25–16)	(Brazil) Rio de Janeiro	13 August	Preliminary round Pool B
5	Russia	0–3 (23–25, 16–25, 20–25)	(Brazil) Rio de Janeiro	15 August	Preliminary round Pool B
6	Italy	0–3 (29–31, 19–25, 17–25)	(Brazil) Rio de Janeiro	17 August	Quarterfinal
Head coach: (Argentina) Raúl Lozano

=== 2020 ===
#	Opponent	Result	Host city	Date	Round
1	Poland	3–2 (18–25, 25–22, 25–22, 22–25, 23–21)	(Japan) Tokyo	24 July (2021)	Preliminary round Pool A
2	Venezuela	3–0 (25–17, 25–20, 25–18)	(Japan) Tokyo	26 July (2021)	Preliminary round Pool A
3	Canada	0–3 (16–25, 20–25, 22–25)	(Japan) Tokyo	28 July (2021)	Preliminary round Pool A
4	Italy	1–3 (28–30, 21–25, 25–21, 21–25)	(Japan) Tokyo	30 July (2021)	Preliminary round Pool A
5	Japan	2–3 (21–25, 25–20, 31–29, 22–25, 13–15)	(Japan) Tokyo	1 August (2021)	Preliminary round Pool A
Head coach: (Russia) Vladimir Alekno

== World Championship ==
=== 1970 ===
#	Opponent	Result	Host city	Date	Round
1	Yugoslavia	2–3 (15–13, 3–15, 11–15, 15–12, 2–15)	(Bulgaria) Sofia	20 September	Preliminary round Pool A
2	Israel	0–3 (6–15, 4–15, 9–15)	(Bulgaria) Sofia	21 September	Preliminary round Pool A
3	Bulgaria	0–3 (4–15, 5–15, 3–15)	(Bulgaria) Sofia	22 September	Preliminary round Pool A
4	Belgium	0–3 (11–15, 5–15, 13–15)	(Bulgaria) Sofia	23 September	Preliminary round Pool A
5	Italy	0–3 (2–15, 6–15, 3–15)	(Bulgaria) Sofia	24 September	Preliminary round Pool A
6	Tunisia	3–0 (15–7, 15–13, 15–13)	(Bulgaria) Haskovo	26 September	Classification 17th–24th
7	France	0–3 (4–15, 9–15, 11–15)	(Bulgaria) Haskovo	27 September	Classification 17th–24th
8	Venezuela	3–0 (15–6, 15–9, 15–12)	(Bulgaria) Haskovo	28 September	Classification 17th–24th
9	Finland	3–1 (6–15, 15–12, 15–10, 15–12)	(Bulgaria) Haskovo	30 September	Classification 17th–24th
10	Guinea	3–2 (15–7, 12–15, 15–3, 3–15, 15–11)	(Bulgaria) Haskovo	1 October	Classification 17th–24th
11	United States	2–3 (8–15, 15–7, 15–12, 9–15, 7–15)	(Bulgaria) Haskovo	2 October	Classification 17th–24th
Head coach: (Czechoslovakia) Miloslav Ejem

=== 1998 ===
#	Opponent	Result	Host city	Date	Round
1	Argentina	0–3 (9–15, 3–15, 7–15)	(Japan) Sapporo	13 November	Preliminary round Pool D
2	Cuba	0–3 (2–15, 5–15, 7–15)	(Japan) Sapporo	14 November	Preliminary round Pool D
3	Poland	0–3 (5–15, 2–15, 8–15)	(Japan) Sapporo	15 November	Preliminary round Pool D
Head coach: (Japan) Fumihiko Matsumoto

=== 2006 ===
#	Opponent	Result	Host city	Date	Round
1	Czech Republic	0–3 (23–25, 19–25, 22–25)	(Japan) Nagano	17 November	Preliminary round Pool C
2	Venezuela	1–3 (20–25, 25–23, 17–25, 20–25)	(Japan) Nagano	18 November	Preliminary round Pool C
3	Italy	1–3 (15–25, 25–21, 21–25, 19–25)	(Japan) Nagano	19 November	Preliminary round Pool C
4	Bulgaria	0–3 (19–25, 18–25, 23–25)	(Japan) Nagano	21 November	Preliminary round Pool C
5	United States	0–3 (19–25, 22–25, 23–25)	(Japan) Nagano	22 November	Preliminary round Pool C
Head coach: (Serbia) Milorad Kijac

=== 2010 ===
#	Opponent	Result	Host city	Date	Round
1	Egypt	0–3 (21–25, 17–25, 21–25)	(Italy) Milan	25 September	Preliminary round Pool A
2	Japan	3–1 (15–25, 25–17, 26–24, 25–23)	(Italy) Milan	26 September	Preliminary round Pool A
3	Italy	2–3 (21–25, 10–25, 25–21, 28–26, 13–15)	(Italy) Milan	27 September	Preliminary round Pool A
Head coach: (Iran) Hossein Maadani

=== 2014 ===
#	Opponent	Result	Host city	Date	Round
1	Italy	3–1 (25–16, 23–25, 25–21, 25–22)	(Poland) Kraków	31 August	Preliminary round Pool D
2	United States	3–2 (25–23, 25–19, 19–25, 18–25, 17–15)	(Poland) Kraków	2 September	Preliminary round Pool D
3	France	1–3 (18–25, 25–14, 19–25, 27–29)	(Poland) Kraków	4 September	Preliminary round Pool D
4	Belgium	3–1 (25–23, 25–15, 21–25, 25–20)	(Poland) Kraków	6 September	Preliminary round Pool D
5	Puerto Rico	3–0 (25–17, 25–22, 25–14)	(Poland) Kraków	7 September	Preliminary round Pool D
6	Australia	3–1 (25–23, 25–21, 21–25, 25–17)	(Poland) Bydgoszcz	10 September	Second round Pool E
7	Argentina	3–0 (25–15, 25–23, 25–16)	(Poland) Bydgoszcz	11 September	Second round Pool E
8	Poland	2–3 (17–25, 16–25, 26–24, 25–19, 14–16)	(Poland) Łódź	13 September	Second round Pool E
9	Serbia	3–1 (27–25, 22–25, 25–22, 25–18)	(Poland) Łódź	14 September	Second round Pool E
10	Germany	0–3 (15–25, 21–25, 19–25)	(Poland) Katowice	17 September	Third round Pool G
11	France	2–3 (20–25, 23–25, 25–22, 25–19, 9–15)	(Poland) Katowice	18 September	Third round Pool G
12	Russia	0–3 (19–25, 21–25, 18–25)	(Poland) Łódź	20 September	Classification 5th–6th
Head coach: (Serbia) Slobodan Kovač

=== 2018 ===
#	Opponent	Result	Host city	Date	Round
1	Puerto Rico	3–0 (25–19, 25–14, 25–18)	(Bulgaria) Varna	12 September	Preliminary round Pool D
2	Bulgaria	3–1 (25–22, 25–20, 22–25, 25–19)	(Bulgaria) Varna	13 September	Preliminary round Pool D
3	Cuba	3–1 (17–25, 25–18, 25–22, 25–19)	(Bulgaria) Varna	15 September	Preliminary round Pool D
4	Poland	0–3 (21–25, 20–25, 22–25)	(Bulgaria) Varna	17 September	Preliminary round Pool D
5	Finland	3–2 (25–19, 22–25, 23–25, 25–23, 15–12)	(Bulgaria) Varna	18 September	Preliminary round Pool D
6	Bulgaria	0–3 (19–25, 26–28, 24–26)	(Bulgaria) Sofia	21 September	Second round Pool G
7	Canada	2–3 (20–25, 25–20, 15–25, 25–23, 12–15)	(Bulgaria) Sofia	22 September	Second round Pool G
8	United States	0–3 (23–25, 24–26, 24–26)	(Bulgaria) Sofia	23 September	Second round Pool G
Head coach: (Montenegro) Igor Kolaković

=== 2022 ===
#	Opponent	Result	Host city	Date	Round
1	Argentina	3–2 (22–25, 30–28, 25–18, 32–34, 21–19)	(Slovenia) Ljubljana	27 August	Preliminary round Pool F
2	Egypt	3–1 (25–14, 25–19, 22–25, 26–24)	(Slovenia) Ljubljana	29 August	Preliminary round Pool F
3	Netherlands	1–3 (22–25, 25–21, 20–25, 18–25)	(Slovenia) Ljubljana	31 August	Preliminary round Pool F
4	Brazil	0–3 (17–25, 22–25, 23–25)	(Poland) Gliwice	6 September	1/8 final
Head coach: (Iran) Behrouz Ataei

=== 2025 ===
#	Opponent	Result	Host city	Date	Round
1	Egypt	1–3 (17–25, 25–16, 23–25, 20–25)	(Philippines) Pasay	14 September	Preliminary round Pool A
2	Tunisia	3–1 (23–25, 25–20, 25–23, 25–16)	(Philippines) Pasay	16 September	Preliminary round Pool A
3	Philippines	3–2 (21–25, 25–21, 17–25, 25–23, 22–20)	(Philippines) Pasay	18 September	Preliminary round Pool A
4	Serbia	3–2 (23–25, 25–19, 24–26, 25–22, 15–9)	(Philippines) Pasay	23 September	1/8 final
5	Czech Republic	1–3 (25–22, 25–27, 20–25, 21–25)	(Philippines) Pasay	25 September	Quarterfinal
Head coach: (Italy) Roberto Piazza

== World Cup ==
=== 1991 ===
#	Opponent	Result	Host city	Date	Round
1	Germany	0–3 (4–15, 11–15, 6–15)	(Japan) Gifu	22 November	Preliminary round Pool B
2	Brazil	0–3 (2–15, 7–15, 2–15)	(Japan) Gifu	23 November	Preliminary round Pool B
3	Algeria	0–3 (10–15, 9–15, 10–15)	(Japan) Gifu	24 November	Preliminary round Pool B
4	Cuba	0–3 (5–15, 3–15, 2–15)	(Japan) Matsumoto	26 November	Preliminary round Pool B
5	South Korea	0–3 (12–15, 4–15, 5–15)	(Japan) Matsumoto	27 November	Preliminary round Pool B
6	Tunisia	1–3 (9–15, 7–15, 16–14, 7–15)	(Japan) Tokyo	29 November	Classification 7th–12th
7	Chile	3–2 (4–15, 15–7, 6–15, 17–15, 15–12)	(Japan) Tokyo	30 November	Classification 7th–12th
8	Mexico	1–3 (14–16, 6–15, 15–7, 5–15)	(Japan) Tokyo	1 December	Classification 7th–12th
Head coach: (Iran) Mohammad Ali Heidarkhan

=== 2011 ===
#	Opponent	Result	Host city	Date	Round
1	Japan	3–1 (17–25, 25–20, 25–23, 25–15)	(Japan) Nagoya	20 November	Round robin
2	Cuba	0–3 (17–25, 17–25, 22–25)	(Japan) Nagoya	21 November	Round robin
3	Serbia	3–2 (25–17, 18–25, 21–25, 25–21, 15–11)	(Japan) Nagoya	22 November	Round robin
4	Poland	3–2 (23–25, 28–26, 8–25, 26–24, 15–11)	(Japan) Osaka	24 November	Round robin
5	Argentina	3–2 (15–25, 25–21, 24–26, 25–16, 15–12)	(Japan) Osaka	25 November	Round robin
6	United States	0–3 (15–25, 25–27, 14–25)	(Japan) Fukuoka	27 November	Round robin
7	Egypt	3–0 (25–18, 25–21, 25–15)	(Japan) Fukuoka	28 November	Round robin
8	China	0–3 (19–25, 19–25, 17–25)	(Japan) Fukuoka	29 November	Round robin
9	Brazil	0–3 (20–25, 18–25, 16–25)	(Japan) Tokyo	2 December	Round robin
10	Russia	0–3 (29–31, 21–25, 18–25)	(Japan) Tokyo	3 December	Round robin
11	Italy	1–3 (13–25, 17–25, 25–20, 18–25)	(Japan) Tokyo	4 December	Round robin
Head coach: (Argentina) Julio Velasco

=== 2015 ===
#	Opponent	Result	Host city	Date	Round
1	Argentina	1–3 (27–25, 22–25, 22–25, 24–26)	(Japan) Hamamatsu	8 September	Round robin
2	Tunisia	3–1 (25–17, 21–25, 25–14, 25–20)	(Japan) Hamamatsu	9 September	Round robin
3	Venezuela	3–0 (25–20, 25–17, 25–15)	(Japan) Hamamatsu	10 September	Round robin
4	Poland	2–3 (25–18, 25–23, 15–25, 20–25, 11–15)	(Japan) Hamamatsu	12 September	Round robin
5	Russia	0–3 (24–26, 18–25, 20–25)	(Japan) Hamamatsu	13 September	Round robin
6	Italy	0–3 (19–25, 23–25, 21–25)	(Japan) Osaka	16 September	Round robin
7	United States	1–3 (25–20, 19–25, 22–25, 21–25)	(Japan) Osaka	17 September	Round robin
8	Japan	3–2 (22–25, 23–25, 25–18, 25–21, 15–12)	(Japan) Osaka	18 September	Round robin
9	Australia	0–3 (25–27, 25–27, 22–25)	(Japan) Tokyo	21 September	Round robin
10	Canada	0–3 (23–25, 27–29, 24–26)	(Japan) Tokyo	22 September	Round robin
11	Egypt	3–0 (25–18, 25–11, 25–23)	(Japan) Tokyo	23 September	Round robin
Head coach: (Serbia) Slobodan Kovač

=== 2019 ===
#	Opponent	Result	Host city	Date	Round
1	Russia	1–3 (21–25, 18–25, 26–24, 22–25)	(Japan) Nagano	1 October	Round robin
2	Egypt	1–3 (25–22, 24–26, 18–25, 24–26)	(Japan) Nagano	2 October	Round robin
3	Canada	3–1 (18–25, 25–23, 27–25, 25–19)	(Japan) Nagano	4 October	Round robin
4	Australia	3–1 (25–22, 18–25, 25–18, 27–25)	(Japan) Nagano	5 October	Round robin
5	Brazil	1–3 (27–25, 21–25, 25–27, 22–25)	(Japan) Nagano	6 October	Round robin
6	United States	1–3 (18–25, 25–22, 18–25, 12–25)	(Japan) Hiroshima	9 October	Round robin
7	Tunisia	3–0 (26–24, 25–17, 25–22)	(Japan) Hiroshima	10 October	Round robin
8	Argentina	3–2 (27–25, 23–25, 19–25, 25–17, 15–10)	(Japan) Hiroshima	11 October	Round robin
9	Japan	1–3 (16–25, 28–26, 13–25, 21–25)	(Japan) Hiroshima	13 October	Round robin
10	Italy	2–3 (27–25, 29–27, 28–30, 17–25, 13–15)	(Japan) Hiroshima	14 October	Round robin
11	Poland	0–3 (18–25, 18–25, 16–25)	(Japan) Hiroshima	15 October	Round robin
Head coach: (Montenegro) Igor Kolaković

== World Grand Champions Cup ==
=== 2009 ===
#	Opponent	Result	Host city	Date	Round
1	Egypt	3–2 (21–25, 25–20, 25–21, 17–25, 15–10)	(Japan) Osaka	18 November	Round robin
2	Brazil	1–3 (22–25, 18–25, 25–23, 19–25)	(Japan) Osaka	19 November	Round robin
3	Japan	2–3 (25–27, 25–18, 23–25, 25–20, 14–16)	(Japan) Nagoya	21 November	Round robin
4	Poland	1–3 (23–25, 25–18, 26–28, 23–25)	(Japan) Nagoya	22 November	Round robin
5	Cuba	1–3 (14–25, 22–25, 25–15, 15–25)	(Japan) Nagoya	23 November	Round robin
Head coach: (Iran) Hossein Maadani

=== 2013 ===
#	Opponent	Result	Host city	Date	Round
1	Brazil	1–3 (16–25, 17–25, 27–25, 23–25)	(Japan) Kyoto	19 November	Round robin
2	Italy	3–2 (26–24, 16–25, 25–23, 23–25, 15–12)	(Japan) Kyoto	20 November	Round robin
3	Russia	0–3 (23–25, 23–25, 19–25)	(Japan) Tokyo	22 November	Round robin
4	United States	3–2 (28–26, 19–25, 19–25, 27–25, 18–16)	(Japan) Tokyo	23 November	Round robin
5	Japan	3–0 (25–17, 25–18, 25–14)	(Japan) Tokyo	24 November	Round robin
Head coach: (Argentina) Julio Velasco

=== 2017 ===
#	Opponent	Result	Host city	Date	Round
1	Italy	3–2 (25–19, 23–25, 28–26, 29–31, 15–11)	(Japan) Nagoya	12 September	Round robin
2	United States	3–2 (20–25, 17–25, 27–25, 25–21, 15–12)	(Japan) Nagoya	13 September	Round robin
3	Brazil	0–3 (22–25, 19–25, 15–25)	(Japan) Osaka	15 September	Round robin
4	Japan	3–1 (21–25, 25–19, 25–20, 25–14)	(Japan) Osaka	16 September	Round robin
5	France	3–2 (38–36, 25–23, 22–25, 25–27, 15–11)	(Japan) Osaka	17 September	Round robin
Head coach: (Montenegro) Igor Kolaković

== World League ==
=== 2013 ===
#	Opponent	Result	Host city	Date	Round
1	Russia	0–3 (21–25, 22–25, 17–25)	(Russia) Kaliningrad	7 June	Intercontinental round Pool B
2	Russia	1–3 (23–25, 22–25, 25–17, 18–25)	(Russia) Kaliningrad	8 June	Intercontinental round Pool B
3	Serbia	2–3 (24–26, 23–25, 25–17, 25–14, 16–18)	(Iran) Tehran	21 June	Intercontinental round Pool B
4	Serbia	3–2 (25–20, 24–26, 23–25, 25–22, 15–12)	(Iran) Tehran	22 June	Intercontinental round Pool B
5	Italy	3–1 (25–23, 25–22, 22–25, 32–30)	(Italy) Modena	28 June	Intercontinental round Pool B
6	Italy	2–3 (22–25, 20–25, 25–20, 25–18, 12–15)	(Italy) Sassari	30 June	Intercontinental round Pool B
7	Cuba	3–2 (24–26, 19–25, 25–19, 25–22, 16–14)	(Cuba) Havana	5 July	Intercontinental round Pool B
8	Cuba	3–1 (22–25, 25–20, 25–18, 25–22)	(Cuba) Havana	6 July	Intercontinental round Pool B
9	Germany	3–0 (25–19, 25–18, 25–20)	(Iran) Tehran	12 July	Intercontinental round Pool B
10	Germany	0–3 (21–25, 23–25, 22–25)	(Iran) Tehran	13 July	Intercontinental round Pool B
Head coach: (Argentina) Julio Velasco

=== 2014 ===
#	Opponent	Result	Host city	Date	Round
1	Italy	0–3 (19–25, 22–25, 23–25)	(Italy) Trieste	30 May	Intercontinental round Group 1 – Pool A
2	Italy	0–3 (25–27, 18–25, 22–25)	(Italy) Verona	1 June	Intercontinental round Group 1 – Pool A
3	Brazil	2–3 (23–25, 30–28, 28–26, 23–25, 13–15)	(Brazil) São Paulo	6 June	Intercontinental round Group 1 – Pool A
4	Brazil	3–0 (25–18, 25–21, 25–22)	(Brazil) São Paulo	7 June	Intercontinental round Group 1 – Pool A
5	Brazil	3–2 (18–25, 27–25, 20–25, 25–17, 15–9)	(Iran) Tehran	13 June	Intercontinental round Group 1 – Pool A
6	Brazil	2–3 (19–25, 17–25, 25–23, 25–23, 10–15)	(Iran) Tehran	15 June	Intercontinental round Group 1 – Pool A
7	Italy	3–0 (25–18, 25–20, 25–15)	(Iran) Tehran	20 June	Intercontinental round Group 1 – Pool A
8	Italy	3–1 (25–22, 25–19, 19–25, 25–20)	(Iran) Tehran	22 June	Intercontinental round Group 1 – Pool A
9	Poland	3–1 (23–25, 25–16, 25–11, 25–19)	(Iran) Tehran	27 June	Intercontinental round Group 1 – Pool A
10	Poland	3–0 (25–22, 25–20, 25–22)	(Iran) Tehran	29 June	Intercontinental round Group 1 – Pool A
11	Poland	1–3 (25–17, 24–26, 23–25, 23–25)	(Poland) Gdańsk	4 July	Intercontinental round Group 1 – Pool A
12	Poland	0–3 (23–25, 20–25, 17–25)	(Poland) Gdańsk	5 July	Intercontinental round Group 1 – Pool A
13	Russia	2–3 (25–18, 18–25, 21–25, 37–35, 8–15)	(Italy) Florence	16 July	Final six Pool I
14	Brazil	3–1 (25–21, 25–19, 23–25, 28–26)	(Italy) Florence	18 July	Final six Pool I
15	United States	0–3 (18–25, 22–25, 16–25)	(Italy) Florence	19 July	Semifinal
16	Italy	0–3 (22–25, 18–25, 22–25)	(Italy) Florence	20 July	Bronze medal match
Head coach: (Serbia) Slobodan Kovač

=== 2015 ===
#	Opponent	Result	Host city	Date	Round
1	United States	1–3 (19–25, 22–25, 25–23, 23–25)	(United States) Los Angeles	30 May	Intercontinental round Group 1 – Pool B
2	United States	1–3 (16–25, 16–25, 25–20, 20–25)	(United States) Los Angeles	31 May	Intercontinental round Group 1 – Pool B
3	Poland	1–3 (20–25, 22–25, 25–21, 25–27)	(Poland) Częstochowa	5 June	Intercontinental round Group 1 – Pool B
4	Poland	2–3 (25–22, 22–25, 16–25, 25–22, 6–15)	(Poland) Częstochowa	6 June	Intercontinental round Group 1 – Pool B
5	Russia	3–1 (20–25, 25–16, 25–19, 25–23)	(Russia) Kazan	13 June	Intercontinental round Group 1 – Pool B
6	Russia	3–0 (25–20, 25–18, 25–21)	(Russia) Kazan	14 June	Intercontinental round Group 1 – Pool B
7	United States	3–0 (25–19, 29–27, 25–20)	(Iran) Tehran	19 June	Intercontinental round Group 1 – Pool B
8	United States	3–0 (25–20, 25–21, 25–19)	(Iran) Tehran	21 June	Intercontinental round Group 1 – Pool B
9	Poland	3–2 (25–21, 23–25, 21–25, 25–16, 15–11)	(Iran) Tehran	26 June	Intercontinental round Group 1 – Pool B
10	Poland	1–3 (25–23, 20–25, 20–25, 19–25)	(Iran) Tehran	28 June	Intercontinental round Group 1 – Pool B
11	Russia	3–0 (25–21, 25–21, 25–21)	(Iran) Tehran	3 July	Intercontinental round Group 1 – Pool B
12	Russia	1–3 (23–25, 25–19, 18–25, 21–25)	(Iran) Tehran	4 July	Intercontinental round Group 1 – Pool B
Head coach: (Serbia) Slobodan Kovač

=== 2016 ===
#	Opponent	Result	Host city	Date	Round
1	Brazil	0–3 (19–25, 16–25, 26–28)	(Brazil) Rio de Janeiro	16 June	Intercontinental round Group 1
2	United States	1–3 (25–23, 13–25, 25–27, 24–26)	(Brazil) Rio de Janeiro	17 June	Intercontinental round Group 1
3	Argentina	3–2 (25–22, 25–20, 21–25, 13–25, 15–11)	(Brazil) Rio de Janeiro	18 June	Intercontinental round Group 1
4	Bulgaria	3–1 (18–25, 25–20, 25–23, 25–20)	(Serbia) Belgrade	23 June	Intercontinental round Group 1
5	Brazil	1–3 (18–25, 26–24, 16–25, 17–25)	(Serbia) Belgrade	24 June	Intercontinental round Group 1
6	Serbia	1–3 (19–25, 26–24, 18–25, 21–25)	(Serbia) Belgrade	25 June	Intercontinental round Group 1
7	Serbia	3–2 (18–25, 22–25, 25–22, 25–23, 16–14)	(Iran) Tehran	1 July	Intercontinental round Group 1
8	Italy	0–3 (20–25, 20–25, 21–25)	(Iran) Tehran	2 July	Intercontinental round Group 1
9	Argentina	3–2 (25–23, 22–25, 21–25, 25–22, 16–14)	(Iran) Tehran	3 July	Intercontinental round Group 1
Head coach: (Argentina) Raúl Lozano

=== 2017 ===
#	Opponent	Result	Host city	Date	Round
1	Italy	0–3 (22–25, 23–25, 22–25)	(Italy) Pesaro	2 June	Intercontinental round Group 1
2	Brazil	1–3 (25–21, 19–25, 22–25, 22–25)	(Italy) Pesaro	3 June	Intercontinental round Group 1
3	Poland	3–1 (18–25, 25–23, 25–23, 25–22)	(Italy) Pesaro	4 June	Intercontinental round Group 1
4	Belgium	3–2 (23–25, 25–17, 25–22, 23–25, 15–12)	(Iran) Tehran	9 June	Intercontinental round Group 1
5	Serbia	1–3 (20–25, 23–25, 25–16, 16–25)	(Iran) Tehran	10 June	Intercontinental round Group 1
6	Argentina	3–2 (29–27, 25–20, 20–25, 23–25, 15–11)	(Iran) Tehran	11 June	Intercontinental round Group 1
7	United States	0–3 (17–25, 22–25, 28–30)	(Poland) Katowice	15 June	Intercontinental round Group 1
8	Poland	0–3 (17–25, 18–25, 22–25)	(Poland) Łódź	17 June	Intercontinental round Group 1
9	Russia	0–3 (24–26, 18–25, 18–25)	(Poland) Łódź	18 June	Intercontinental round Group 1
Head coach: (Montenegro) Igor Kolaković

== Nations League ==
=== 2018 ===
#	Opponent	Result	Host city	Date	Round
1	France	1–3 (20–25, 26–24, 20–25, 17–25)	(France) Rouen	25 May	Preliminary round
2	Australia	3–0 (25–23, 25–23, 25–21)	(France) Rouen	26 May	Preliminary round
3	Japan	1–3 (22–25, 28–30, 25–23, 23–25)	(France) Rouen	27 May	Preliminary round
4	Argentina	3–2 (21–25, 25–22, 25–22, 24–26, 15–9)	(Argentina) San Juan	1 June	Preliminary round
5	Italy	0–3 (23–25, 18–25, 20–25)	(Argentina) San Juan	2 June	Preliminary round
6	Canada	1–3 (23–25, 22–25, 25–21, 21–25)	(Argentina) San Juan	3 June	Preliminary round
7	China	3–0 (25–19, 25–20, 25–15)	(Russia) Ufa	8 June	Preliminary round
8	Brazil	2–3 (17–25, 25–23, 19–25, 25–21, 13–15)	(Russia) Ufa	9 June	Preliminary round
9	Russia	1–3 (30–28, 23–25, 25–27, 21–25)	(Russia) Ufa	10 June	Preliminary round
10	Poland	3–0 (26–24, 26–24, 25–22)	(United States) Hoffman Estates	15 June	Preliminary round
11	Serbia	2–3 (25–21, 22–25, 25–27, 25–20, 11–15)	(United States) Hoffman Estates	16 June	Preliminary round
12	United States	0–3 (27–29, 20–25, 24–26)	(United States) Hoffman Estates	17 June	Preliminary round
13	South Korea	3–1 (27–25, 23–25, 25–22, 25–23)	(Iran) Tehran	22 June	Preliminary round
14	Bulgaria	3–1 (25–22, 25–15, 23–25, 25–14)	(Iran) Tehran	23 June	Preliminary round
15	Germany	3–2 (25–20, 23–25, 25–22, 22–25, 15–11)	(Iran) Tehran	24 June	Preliminary round
Head coach: (Montenegro) Igor Kolaković

=== 2019 ===
#	Opponent	Result	Host city	Date	Round
1	Italy	3–1 (20–25, 25–23, 25–23, 25–23)	(China) Jiangmen	31 May	Preliminary round
2	China	3–0 (25–22, 25–18, 25–21)	(China) Jiangmen	1 June	Preliminary round
3	Germany	3–0 (30–28, 29–27, 25–20)	(China) Jiangmen	2 June	Preliminary round
4	Brazil	2–3 (25–23, 16–25, 25–21, 31–33, 10–15)	(Japan) Tokyo	7 June	Preliminary round
5	Argentina	3–1 (25–19, 20–25, 25–22, 34–32)	(Japan) Tokyo	8 June	Preliminary round
6	Japan	3–0 (25–22, 25–21, 25–19)	(Japan) Tokyo	9 June	Preliminary round
7	Canada	3–0 (25–15, 26–24, 25–16)	(Iran) Urmia	14 June	Preliminary round
8	Poland	3–2 (25–20, 21–25, 18–25, 25–17, 15–8)	(Iran) Urmia	15 June	Preliminary round
9	Russia	3–0 (25–20, 26–24, 25–23)	(Iran) Urmia	16 June	Preliminary round
10	Portugal	3–1 (23–25, 27–25, 25–17, 25–18)	(Iran) Ardabil	21 June	Preliminary round
11	Australia	3–0 (25–19, 25–19, 25–14)	(Iran) Ardabil	22 June	Preliminary round
12	France	0–3 (18–25, 24–26, 21–25)	(Iran) Ardabil	23 June	Preliminary round
13	Serbia	3–1 (25–23, 26–28, 25–22, 25–19)	(Bulgaria) Plovdiv	28 June	Preliminary round
14	Bulgaria	3–0 (25–23, 25–23, 25–21)	(Bulgaria) Plovdiv	29 June	Preliminary round
15	United States	0–3 (25–27, 21–25, 20–25)	(Bulgaria) Plovdiv	30 June	Preliminary round
16	Poland	1–3 (25–21, 18–25, 20–25, 22–25)	(United States) Chicago	11 July	Final six Pool B
17	Brazil	2–3 (20–25, 23–25, 26–24, 25–20, 10–15)	(United States) Chicago	12 July	Final six Pool B
Head coach: (Montenegro) Igor Kolaković

=== 2021 ===
#	Opponent	Result	Host city	Date	Round
1	Japan	0–3 (19–25, 22–25, 24–26)	(Italy) Rimini	28 May	Preliminary round
2	Russia	1–3 (17–25, 25–20, 20–25, 17–25)	(Italy) Rimini	29 May	Preliminary round
3	Netherlands	3–0 (25–18, 25–23, 30–28)	(Italy) Rimini	30 May	Preliminary round
4	Canada	3–1 (22–25, 25–22, 25–22, 25–22)	(Italy) Rimini	3 June	Preliminary round
5	Italy	3–1 (26–24, 29–27, 21–25, 25–22)	(Italy) Rimini	4 June	Preliminary round
6	Bulgaria	3–0 (25–20, 33–31, 25–22)	(Italy) Rimini	5 June	Preliminary round
7	United States	3–0 (25–19, 25–23, 25–23)	(Italy) Rimini	9 June	Preliminary round
8	Serbia	2–3 (25–21, 15–25, 28–26, 22–25, 8–15)	(Italy) Rimini	10 June	Preliminary round
9	Germany	2–3 (25–23, 20–25, 19–25, 25–19, 13–15)	(Italy) Rimini	11 June	Preliminary round
10	Australia	2–3 (23–25, 22–25, 25–23, 25–18, 12–15)	(Italy) Rimini	15 June	Preliminary round
11	Brazil	1–3 (19–25, 25–23, 19–25, 21–25)	(Italy) Rimini	16 June	Preliminary round
12	Slovenia	1–3 (25–14, 20–25, 19–25, 30–32)	(Italy) Rimini	17 June	Preliminary round
13	France	0–3 (21–25, 21–25, 19–25)	(Italy) Rimini	21 June	Preliminary round
14	Poland	0–3 (20–25, 20–25, 16–25)	(Italy) Rimini	22 June	Preliminary round
15	Argentina	1–3 (31–33, 23–25, 32–30, 18–25)	(Italy) Rimini	23 June	Preliminary round
Head coach: (Russia) Vladimir Alekno

=== 2022 ===
#	Opponent	Result	Host city	Date	Round
1	China	3–1 (25–15, 19–25, 25–22, 25–15)	(Brazil) Brasília	7 June	Preliminary round
2	Netherlands	0–3 (24–26, 21–25, 21–25)	(Brazil) Brasília	10 June	Preliminary round
3	Australia	3–1 (25–14, 25–22, 18–25, 25–15)	(Brazil) Brasília	11 June	Preliminary round
4	Japan	0–3 (20–25, 14–25, 19–25)	(Brazil) Brasília	12 June	Preliminary round
5	Bulgaria	0–3 (19–25, 23–25, 24–26)	(Bulgaria) Sofia	21 June	Preliminary round
6	United States	3–0 (25–18, 29–27, 27–25)	(Bulgaria) Sofia	23 June	Preliminary round
7	Brazil	0–3 (28–30, 23–25, 19–25)	(Bulgaria) Sofia	24 June	Preliminary round
8	Canada	3–0 (25–21, 27–25, 25–18)	(Bulgaria) Sofia	25 June	Preliminary round
9	Poland	3–2 (21–25, 25–23, 25–22, 25–27, 15–7)	(Poland) Gdańsk	5 July	Preliminary round
10	Italy	1–3 (16–25, 27–25, 23–25, 23–25)	(Poland) Gdańsk	7 July	Preliminary round
11	Slovenia	3–0 (26–24, 25–14, 25–21)	(Poland) Gdańsk	8 July	Preliminary round
12	Serbia	3–0 (35–33, 25–21, 25–12)	(Poland) Gdańsk	9 July	Preliminary round
13	Poland	2–3 (21–25, 26–24, 18–25, 25–16, 7–15)	(Italy) Bologna	21 July	Quarterfinal
Head coach: (Iran) Behrouz Ataei

=== 2023 ===
#	Opponent	Result	Host city	Date	Round
1	Japan	0–3 (16–25, 22–25, 19–25)	(Japan) Nagoya	6 June	Preliminary round
2	Poland	2–3 (25–23, 25–23, 21–25, 15–25, 13–15)	(Japan) Nagoya	8 June	Preliminary round
3	China	3–1 (23–25, 25–15, 25–20, 25–14)	(Japan) Nagoya	10 June	Preliminary round
4	Slovenia	0–3 (19–25, 23–25, 23–25)	(Japan) Nagoya	11 June	Preliminary round
5	Germany	3–0 (25–23, 26–24, 25–16)	(Netherlands) Rotterdam	20 June	Preliminary round
6	Italy	0–3 (19–25, 16–25, 24–26)	(Netherlands) Rotterdam	21 June	Preliminary round
7	United States	0–3 (22–25, 18–25, 23–25)	(Netherlands) Rotterdam	23 June	Preliminary round
8	Netherlands	2–3 (25–16, 16–25, 25–21, 17–25, 10–15)	(Netherlands) Rotterdam	24 June	Preliminary round
9	France	0–3 (18–25, 22–25, 19–25)	(United States) Anaheim	4 July	Preliminary round
10	Bulgaria	2–3 (25–21, 21–25, 25–22, 22–25, 11–15)	(United States) Anaheim	6 July	Preliminary round
11	Argentina	2–3 (19–25, 30–28, 29–27, 20–25, 11–15)	(United States) Anaheim	8 July	Preliminary round
12	Cuba	2–3 (22–25, 28–26, 23–25, 30–28, 10–15)	(United States) Anaheim	9 July	Preliminary round
Head coach: (Iran) Behrouz Ataei

=== 2024 ===
#	Opponent	Result	Host city	Date	Round
1	Serbia	1–3 (25–27, 25–17, 19–25, 18–25)	(Brazil) Rio de Janeiro	22 May	Preliminary round
2	Italy	0–3 (19–25, 18–25, 11–25)	(Brazil) Rio de Janeiro	24 May	Preliminary round
3	Cuba	1–3 (20–25, 25–14, 21–25, 21–25)	(Brazil) Rio de Janeiro	25 May	Preliminary round
4	Argentina	2–3 (25–23, 29–31, 25–20, 20–25, 13–15)	(Brazil) Rio de Janeiro	26 May	Preliminary round
5	Japan	0–3 (23–25, 22–25, 17–25)	(Japan) Fukuoka	4 June	Preliminary round
6	Brazil	1–3 (19–25, 25–22, 16–25, 23–25)	(Japan) Fukuoka	6 June	Preliminary round
7	Bulgaria	2–3 (25–20, 22–25, 23–25, 25–20, 11–15)	(Japan) Fukuoka	7 June	Preliminary round
8	Turkey	1–3 (25–22, 23–25, 23–25, 25–27)	(Japan) Fukuoka	8 June	Preliminary round
9	United States	3–2 (26–28, 25–23, 25–18, 26–18, 15–13)	(Philippines) Manila	19 June	Preliminary round
10	Netherlands	3–2 (25–22, 22–25, 25–21, 20–25, 15–10)	(Philippines) Manila	20 June	Preliminary round
11	France	0–3 (21–25, 17–25, 20–25)	(Philippines) Manila	21 June	Preliminary round
12	Germany	0–3 (20–25, 23–25, 20–25)	(Philippines) Manila	23 June	Preliminary round
Head coach: (Brazil) Maurício Paes (1–7) and (Iran) Peiman Akbari (8–12)

=== 2025 ===
#	Opponent	Result	Host city	Date	Round
1	Brazil	0–3 (19–25, 16–25, 18–25)	(Brazil) Rio de Janeiro	11 June	Preliminary round
2	United States	2–3 (25–19, 25–21, 21–25, 23–25, 15–17)	(Brazil) Rio de Janeiro	12 June	Preliminary round
3	Slovenia	2–3 (25–17, 23–25, 18–25, 25–18, 12–15)	(Brazil) Rio de Janeiro	13 June	Preliminary round
4	Ukraine	3–2 (28–30, 25–20, 22–25, 25–21, 15–9)	(Brazil) Rio de Janeiro	15 June	Preliminary round
5	Serbia	3–1 (25–21, 25–19, 23–25, 25–23)	(Serbia) Belgrade	25 June	Preliminary round
6	Argentina	3–1 (25–21, 22–25, 25–22, 25–22)	(Serbia) Belgrade	27 June	Preliminary round
7	Germany	1–3 (22–25, 25–23, 24–26, 22–25)	(Serbia) Belgrade	28 June	Preliminary round
8	Netherlands	3–2 (25–19, 22–25, 21–25, 25–19, 15–9)	(Serbia) Belgrade	29 June	Preliminary round
9	Poland	2–3 (19–25, 25–23, 18–25, 25–21, 8–15)	(Poland) Gdańsk	16 July	Preliminary round
10	China	3–0 (28–26, 25–21, 25–17)	(Poland) Gdańsk	17 July	Preliminary round
11	France	0–3 (24–26, 16–25, 24–26)	(Poland) Gdańsk	19 July	Preliminary round
12	Bulgaria	3–0 (25–17, 25–17, 25–16)	(Poland) Gdańsk	20 July	Preliminary round
Head coach: (Italy) Roberto Piazza

=== 2026 ===
#	Opponent	Result	Host city	Date	Round
1	Brazil	1–3 (21–25, 25–23, 15–25, 23–25)	(Brazil) Brasília	10 June	Preliminary round
2	Bulgaria	0–3 (23–25, 19–25, 21–25)	(Brazil) Brasília	11 June	Preliminary round
3	Argentina	3–0 (25–23, 25–19, 25–23)	(Brazil) Brasília	12 June	Preliminary round
4	Belgium	2–3 (23–25, 22–25, 25–23, 25–17, 12–15)	(Brazil) Brasília	14 June	Preliminary round
5	France	2–3 (21–25, 25–23, 21–25, 26–24, 15–17)	(France) Orléans	24 June	Preliminary round
6	United States	0–3 (23–25, 20–25, 29–31)	(France) Orléans	25 June	Preliminary round
7	Japan	2–3 (19–25, 19–25, 25–20, 25–23, 12–15)	(France) Orléans	26 June	Preliminary round
8	Cuba	3–1 (25–22, 25–21, 20–25, 30–28)	(France) Orléans	28 June	Preliminary round
9	Ukraine	1–3 (22–25, 21–25, 31–29, 19–25)	(Serbia) Belgrade	15 July	Preliminary round
10	Germany	3–2 (25–22, 26–28, 18–25, 25–20, 15–12)	(Serbia) Belgrade	16 July	Preliminary round
11	Slovenia	0–3 (25–27, 19–25, 24–26)	(Serbia) Belgrade	17 July	Preliminary round
12	Turkey	1–3 (25–17, 22–25, 16–25, 19–25)	(Serbia) Belgrade	19 July	Preliminary round
Head coach: (Italy) Roberto Piazza
