= Feyzi =

Feyzi (Persian: فیضی) is a Turkish-language masculine given name and Persian-language surname derived from the Persian noun of Arabic origin فیض (fayz) with the meaning "grace". Notable people with the name include:

== Given name ==
- Feyzi Mengüç (1894–1983), Ottoman military person
- Aziz Feyzi Pirinççizâde (1878–1933), Kurdish politician in the Ottoman Empire
- Feyzi Ahsen Böre (1917–1975), Turkish ice hockey player

== Surname ==
- Mohammad Feyzi (born 1981), Iranian academic and reformist politician
- Yaser Feyzi (born 1992), Iranian footballer
