= Zeyd Ahsen-Böre =

Finnish ice hockey player (1920–1984)

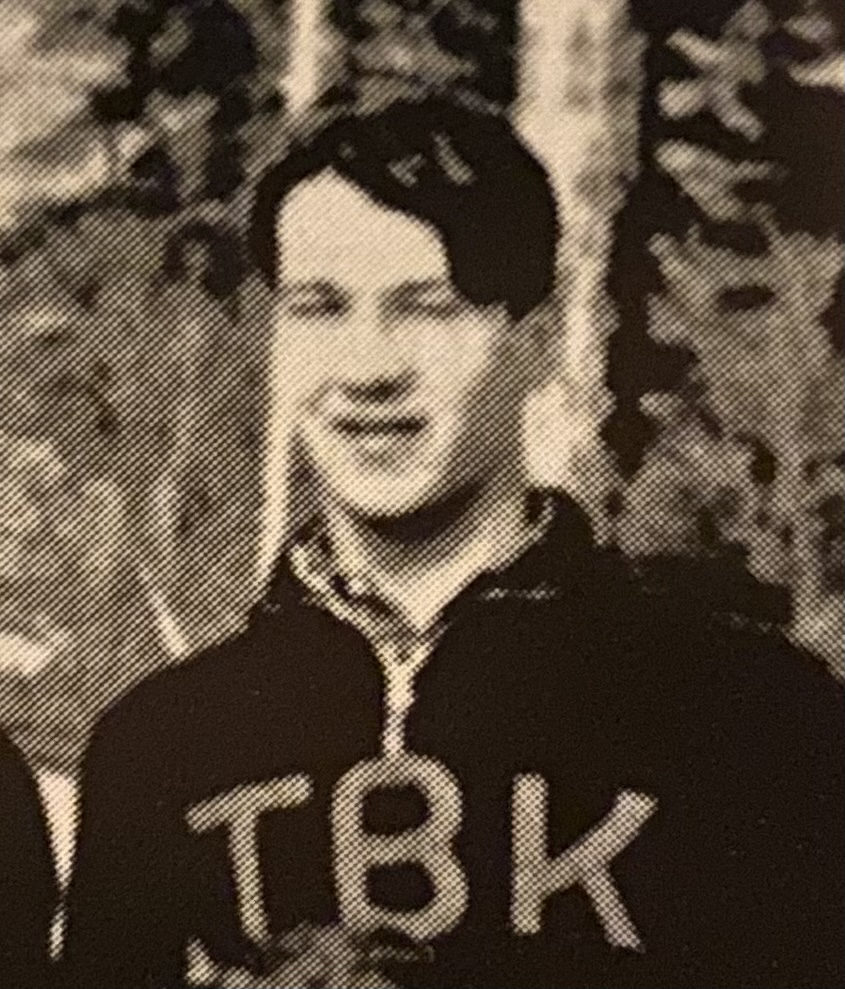
- Born: 9 December 1920; Tampere, Finland
- Died: 28 August 1984 (aged 63); Linghem, Östergötland County, Sweden
- Position: Forward
- Played for: SM-sarja; TBK Tampere
- Playing career: 1942–1946

Zeyd Ahsen-Böre (also Zeud - Tatar: Зәет Әхсән Бүре, Zäyet Äxsän Büre; 9 December 1920 – 28 August 1984) was a Finnish ice hockey player. He began his career with TBK Tampere in 1942, and remained with the team until 1946. His brothers, Feyzi, Murat, and Vasif were also hockey players. Their father was the Tatar businessman Zinnetullah Ahsen Böre. Zeyd Ahsen-Böre died in Linghem, Östergötland County, Sweden on 28 August 1984, at the age of 63.

== Career statistics ==
			Regular Season					Playoffs
Season	Team	League	GP	G	A	Pts	PIM	GP	G	A	Pts	PIM
1942-43	TBK Tampere	SM-sarja	4	0	0	0	0	--	--	--	--	--
1943-44	TBK Tampere	SM-sarja	4	0	0	0	0	--	--	--	--	--
1945-46	TBK Tampere	SM-sarja	1	3	0	3	0	--	--	--	--	--
