= Mustafa Cengiz =

Mustafa Cengiz may refer to:

- Mustafa Cengiz (businessman), Turkish businessman and president of sports club Galatasaray S.K.
- Mustafa Cengiz (volleyball), Turkish volleyball player
