= Vasif Ahsen-Böre =

Finnish ice hockey player

- Born: 1 January 1924; Tampere, Finland
- Died: 2008
- Position: Defense
- Played for: SM-sarja; TBK Tampere
- Playing career: 1942–1945

Vasif Ahsen-Böre (Tatar: Васыйф Әхсән Бүре; Wasıyf Äxsän Büre; 1 January 1924 – 2008) was a Finnish ice hockey player. He began his career with TBK Tampere in 1942, and remained with the team until 1945. His brothers Feyzi, Murat, and Zeyd were also hockey players. Their father was the Tatar businessman Zinnetullah Ahsen Böre.

== Career statistics ==
			Regular Season					Playoffs
Season	Team	League	GP	G	A	Pts	PIM	GP	G	A	Pts	PIM
1942-43	TBK Tampere	SM-sarja	7	2	0	2	0	--	--	--	--	--
1943-44	TBK Tampere	SM-sarja	4	0	0	0	0	--	--	--	--	--
1944-45	TBK Tampere	SM-sarja	7	2	0	2	0	--	--	--	--	--
