= 2021 Men's European Volleyball League =

2021 Men's European League
Tournament details
- Host country: Belgium
- Dates: 28 May – 20 June
- Teams: 19

Final positions
- Champions: Turkey (2nd title)
- Runners-up: Ukraine
- Third place: Estonia
- Fourth place: Belgium

Tournament awards
- MVP: (Turkey) Adis Lagumdzija

The 2021 Men's European Volleyball League was the 17th edition of the annual Men's European Volleyball League, which featured men's national volleyball teams from 20 European countries.

The tournament had two divisions: the Golden League, which featured twelve teams, and the Silver League with eight teams.

== Pools composition ==
Teams were seeded following the serpentine system according to their European Ranking for national teams as of January 2020. Rankings are shown in brackets. Netherlands withdrew on 26 April after it was chosen by the FIVB to replace China in the FIVB Volleyball Men's Nations League leaving Pool B with three teams.

=== Golden league ===
Pool A	Pool B	Pool C
Belgium (3)	~~Netherlands (8)~~	Turkey (11)
Spain (14)	Ukraine (14)	Czech Republic (11)
Estonia (16)	Slovakia (17)	Belarus (19)
Latvia (23)	Romania (22)	Portugal (20)

=== Silver league ===
Pool A	Pool B
North Macedonia (24)	Austria (25)
Israel (28)	Croatia (27)
Denmark (29)	Hungary (34)
Cyprus (41)	Luxembourg (35)

== Pool standing procedure ==
1. Total number of victories (matches won, matches lost)
2. In the event of a tie, the following first tiebreaker will apply: The teams will be ranked by the most point gained per match as follows:
  - Match won 3–0 or 3–1: 3 points for the winner, 0 points for the loser
  - Match won 3–2: 2 points for the winner, 1 point for the loser
  - Match forfeited: 3 points for the winner, 0 points (0–25, 0–25, 0–25) for the loser
3. If teams are still tied after examining the number of victories and points gained, then the FIVB will examine the results in order to break the tie in the following order:
  - Set quotient: if two or more teams are tied on the number of points gained, they will be ranked by the quotient resulting from the division of the number of all set won by the number of all sets lost.
  - Points quotient: if the tie persists based on the set quotient, the teams will be ranked by the quotient resulting from the division of all points scored by the total of points lost during all sets.
  - If the tie persists based on the point quotient, the tie will be broken based on the team that won the match of the Round Robin Phase between the tied teams. When the tie in point quotient is between three or more teams, these teams ranked taking into consideration only the matches involving the teams in question.

== League round ==
- All times are local.

=== Golden league ===
==== Pool A ====
Pos	Team	Pld	W	L	Pts	SW	SL	SR	SPW	SPL	SPR	Qualification
1	Estonia	6	6	0	17	18	4	4.500	538	442	1.217	Golden League Final round
2	Belgium (Note: Qualified as hosts) (H)	6	4	2	13	15	9	1.667	593	556	1.067	Golden League Final round
3	Spain	6	2	4	6	8	13	0.615	472	518	0.911	
4	Latvia	6	0	6	0	3	18	0.167	427	514	0.831	Relegated position

(H) Host
Notes:

Date	Time		Score		Set 1	Set 2	Set 3	Set 4	Set 5	Total	Report
28 May	17:00	Estonia	3–0	Spain	25–23	25–16	25–18			75–57	Report
28 May	20:00	Latvia	1–3	Belgium	25–19	16–25	14–25	21–25		76–94	Report
29 May	16:00	Spain	1–3	Belgium	23–25	25–21	22–25	33–35		103–106	Report
29 May	19:00	Estonia	3–0	Latvia	25–23	25–13	25–11			75–47	Report
30 May	16:00	Spain	3–1	Latvia	26–24	25–23	19–25	26–24		96–96	Report
30 May	19:00	Belgium	2–3	Estonia	25–20	25–20	19–25	21–25	16–18	106–108	Report
4 Jun	16:00	Estonia	3–1	Spain	22–25	25–13	25–18	25–16		97–72	Report
4 Jun	19:40	Latvia	1–3	Belgium	28–30	23–25	25–19	16–25		92–99	Report
5 Jun	15:45	Spain	3–0	Latvia	25–21	25–23	25–19			75–63	Report
5 Jun	19:00	Belgium	1–3	Estonia	25–20	26–28	30–32	26–28		107–108	Report
6 Jun	15:00	Spain	0–3	Belgium	23–25	17–25	29–31			69–81	Report
6 Jun	17:30	Estonia	3–0	Latvia	25–20	25–17	25–16			75–53	Report

==== Pool B ====
Pos	Team	Pld	W	L	Pts	SW	SL	SR	SPW	SPL	SPR	Qualification
1	Ukraine	4	4	0	12	12	3	4.000	374	332	1.127	Golden League Final round
2	Romania	4	1	3	4	7	10	0.700	396	401	0.988	
3	Slovakia	4	1	3	2	5	11	0.455	344	381	0.903	

Date	Time		Score		Set 1	Set 2	Set 3	Set 4	Set 5	Total	Report
1 Jun	18:00	Ukraine	3–1	Romania	22–25	34–32	25–23	25–19		106–99	Report
2 Jun	18:00	Romania	2–3	Slovakia	29–27	21–25	25–22	24–26	12–15	111–115	Report
3 Jun	18:00	Slovakia	0–3	Ukraine	21–25	8–25	21–25			50–75	Report
4 Jun	18:00	Romania	1–3	Ukraine	25–15	20–25	18–25	27–29		90–94	Report
5 Jun	18:00	Slovakia	1–3	Romania	25–21	20–25	22–25	19–25		86–96	Report
6 Jun	19:30	Ukraine	3–1	Slovakia	23–25	25–23	25–21	26–24		99–93	Report

==== Pool C ====
Pos	Team	Pld	W	L	Pts	SW	SL	SR	SPW	SPL	SPR	Qualification
1	Turkey	6	6	0	18	18	2	9.000	497	402	1.236	Golden League Final round
2	Belarus	6	3	3	7	10	14	0.714	509	544	0.936	
3	Czech Republic	6	2	4	7	11	13	0.846	546	549	0.995	
4	Portugal	6	1	5	4	7	17	0.412	511	568	0.900	

Date	Time		Score		Set 1	Set 2	Set 3	Set 4	Set 5	Total	Report
28 May	16:00	Czech Republic	1–3	Turkey	19–25	25–22	21–25	21–25		86–97	Report
29 May	16:00	Portugal	0–3	Turkey	19–25	24–26	17–25			60–76	Report
29 May	19:00	Belarus	3–1	Czech Republic	25–21	18–25	25–17	25–23		93–86	Report
30 May	16:00	Czech Republic	2–3	Portugal	25–20	25–27	37–39	25–22	12–15	124–123	Report
30 May	19:00	Turkey	3–0	Belarus	25–21	25–20	25–16			75–57	Report
31 May	14:00	Belarus	3–2	Portugal	25–22	25–20	23–25	16–25	15–10	104–102	Report
4 Jun	16:00	Turkey	3–0	Belarus	25–20	25–23	25–19			75–62	Report
4 Jun	19:00	Czech Republic	3–0	Portugal	25–20	25–20	25–18			75–58	Report
5 Jun	15:00	Belarus	1–3	Czech Republic	20–25	22–25	25–23	17–25		84–98	Report
5 Jun	18:00	Portugal	0–3	Turkey	28–30	16–25	16–25			60–80	Report
6 Jun	15:00	Czech Republic	1–3	Turkey	18–25	14–25	25–19	20–25		77–94	Report
6 Jun	18:00	Belarus	3–2	Portugal	17–25	22–25	25–20	25–20	20–18	109–108	Report

=== Silver league ===
==== Pool A ====
Pos	Team	Pld	W	L	Pts	SW	SL	SR	SPW	SPL	SPR	Qualification
1	North Macedonia (Note: Qualified as hosts) (H)	6	5	1	15	15	6	2.500	517	493	1.049	Silver League Final round
2	Denmark	6	4	2	11	12	8	1.500	455	437	1.041	Silver League Final round
3	Israel	6	2	4	6	10	14	0.714	572	554	1.032	
4	Cyprus	6	1	5	4	6	15	0.400	439	499	0.880	

(H) Host
Notes:

Date	Time		Score		Set 1	Set 2	Set 3	Set 4	Set 5	Total	Report
21 May	17:00	Denmark	3–2	Israel	21–25	26–24	17–25	26–24	15–12	105–110	Report
21 May	20:00	Cyprus	0–3	North Macedonia	21–25	21–25	21–25			63–75	Report
22 May	17:00	Denmark	3–0	Cyprus	25–23	25–22	25–20			75–65	Report
22 May	20:00	Israel	1–3	North Macedonia	25–21	22–25	23–25	29–31		99–102	Report
23 May	17:00	Israel	3–2	Cyprus	25–14	25–27	25–27	25–21	18–16	118–105	Report
23 May	20:00	North Macedonia	0–3	Denmark	21–25	23–25	24–26			68–76	Report
28 May	16:00	Israel	0–3	Cyprus	23–25	23–25	17–25			63–75	Report
28 May	19:00	North Macedonia	3–0	Denmark	25–23	25–17	25–21			75–61	Report
29 May	16:00	Israel	1–3	North Macedonia	25–16	30–32	29–31	23–25		107–104	Report
29 May	19:00	Denmark	3–0	Cyprus	25–11	25–20	25–13			75–44	Report
30 May	16:00	Cyprus	1–3	North Macedonia	22–25	18–25	25–18	22–25		87–93	Report
30 May	19:00	Denmark	0–3	Israel	22–25	20–25	21–25			63–75	Report

==== Pool B ====
Pos	Team	Pld	W	L	Pts	SW	SL	SR	SPW	SPL	SPR	Qualification
1	Hungary	6	5	1	14	15	6	2.500	493	436	1.131	Silver League Final round
2	Croatia	6	4	2	12	15	9	1.667	549	485	1.132	Silver League Final round
3	Austria	6	2	4	7	10	14	0.714	492	526	0.935	
4	Luxembourg	6	1	5	3	4	15	0.267	384	471	0.815	

Date	Time		Score		Set 1	Set 2	Set 3	Set 4	Set 5	Total	Report
21 May	17:30	Croatia	3–1	Luxembourg	29–31	25–12	25–16	25–20		104–79	Report
21 May	20:25	Austria	2–3	Hungary	25–23	25–18	20–25	15–25	13–15	98–106	Report
22 May	17:30	Hungary	3–0	Luxembourg	25–16	25–23	25–19			75–58	Report
22 May	20:25	Croatia	3–2	Austria	23–25	25–21	25–16	20–25	15–10	108–97	Report
23 May	17:50	Hungary	3–1	Croatia	25–19	21–25	25–22	25–20		96–86	Report
23 May	15:00	Luxembourg	0–3	Austria	19–25	22–25	21–25			62–75	Report
27 May	17:30	Austria	0–3	Hungary	21–25	21–25	18–25			60–75	Report
27 May	20:00	Croatia	3–0	Luxembourg	25–19	25–16	25–17			75–52	Report
28 May	20:00	Hungary	0–3	Croatia	21–25	24–26	21–25			66–76	Report
29 May	17:30	Croatia	2–3	Austria	17–25	25–20	23–25	25–10	10–15	100–95	Report
29 May	20:00	Hungary	3–0	Luxembourg	25–20	25–16	25–22			75–58	Report
30 May	20:00	Luxembourg	3–0	Austria	25–23	25–22	25–22			75–67	Report

== Final round ==
- All times are Central European Summer Time (UTC+02:00).

=== Silver League ===
- Venue: Strumica Park, Strumica, North Macedonia

Semifinals
5 June
North Macedonia	3
Croatia	2
5 June
Hungary	1
Denmark	3

Final
6 June
North Macedonia	1
Denmark	3
3rd place match
6 June
Croatia	2
Hungary	3

==== Semifinals ====
Date	Time		Score		Set 1	Set 2	Set 3	Set 4	Set 5	Total	Report
5 Jun	17:00	North Macedonia	3–2	Croatia	15–25	25–19	25–22	21–25	15–12	101–103	Report
5 Jun	20:00	Hungary	1–3	Denmark	26–24	17–25	11–25	27–29		81–103	Report

==== 3rd place ====
Date	Time		Score		Set 1	Set 2	Set 3	Set 4	Set 5	Total	Report
6 Jun	17:00	Croatia	2–3	Hungary	18–25	25–18	23–25	25–19	13–15	104–102	Report

==== Final ====
Date	Time		Score		Set 1	Set 2	Set 3	Set 4	Set 5	Total	Report
6 Jun	20:00	North Macedonia	1–3	Denmark	25–23	19–25	25–27	19–25		88–100	Report

=== Golden League ===
- Venue: SC Lange Munte, Kortrijk, Belgium

Semifinals
19 June
Estonia	2
Turkey	3
19 June
Ukraine	3
Belgium	0

Final
20 June
Turkey	3
Ukraine	1
3rd place match
20 June
Estonia	3
Belgium	0

==== Semifinals ====
Date	Time		Score		Set 1	Set 2	Set 3	Set 4	Set 5	Total	Report
19 Jun	17:00	Estonia	2–3	Turkey	25–20	25–13	22–25	23–25	13–15	108–98	Report
19 Jun	20:00	Ukraine	3–0	Belgium	25–15	25–19	25–22			75–56	Report

==== 3rd place ====
Date	Time		Score		Set 1	Set 2	Set 3	Set 4	Set 5	Total	Report
20 Jun	17:00	Estonia	3–0	Belgium	25–22	25–19	25–19			75–60	Report

==== Final ====
Date	Time		Score		Set 1	Set 2	Set 3	Set 4	Set 5	Total	Report
20 Jun	20:00	Turkey	3–1	Ukraine	25–11	25–20	18–25	25–21		93–77	Report

== Final standing ==
Rank	Team
1st place, gold medalist(s)	Turkey
2nd place, silver medalist(s)	Ukraine
3rd place, bronze medalist(s)	Estonia
4	Belgium
5	Belarus
5	Romania
7	Czech Republic
7	Slovakia
7	Spain
10	Latvia
10	Portugal
12	Denmark
13	North Macedonia
14	Hungary
15	Croatia
16	Austria
16	Israel
18	Cyprus
18	Luxembourg

Qualified for the 2022 Challenger Cup

2021 European League champions

Turkey
2nd title

14-man Roster for Golden League Final Round
Ramazan Mandiraci, Baturalp Burak Güngör, Bedirhan Bülbül, Mirza Lagumdžija, Murat Yenipazar, Yiğit Gülmezoğlu, Adis Lagumdžija, Oğuzhan Karasu, Kaan Gürbüz, Mustafa Cengiz, Ahmet Tümer, Caner Ergül, Arda Bostan, Beytullah Hatipoğlu
Head coach
Nedim Özbey

== Awards ==
- Most Valuable Player

(Turkey) Adis Lagumdzija

== See also ==
- 2021 Women's European Volleyball League
