= Arie Selinger =

Israeli volleyball coach (born 1937)

Arie Selinger אריה סלינגר
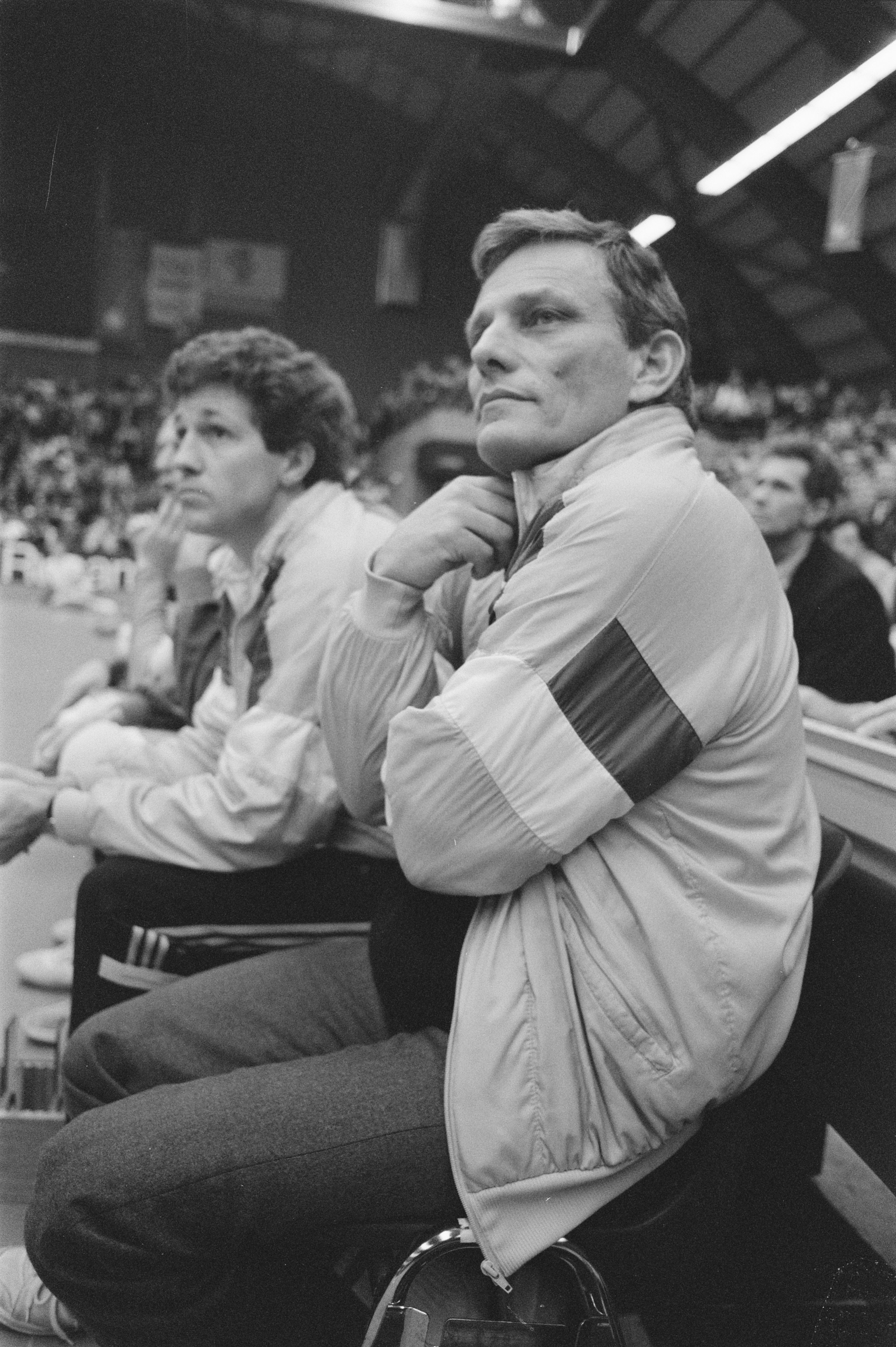

Personal information
- Born: 5 April 1937 (age 89); Kraków, Poland
- Education: University of Illinois (PhD in physiology of exercise)

National team
1975–1984; 1986–1992; 1992–2006	United States; Netherlands; Japan
Honours

Coach for women's volleyball
Representing United States
Olympic Games
Silver medal – second place	1984 Los Angeles	Team
World Championship
Bronze medal – third place	1982 Peru
Pan American Games
Silver medal – second place	1983 Caracas	Team
Coach for men's volleyball
Representing Netherlands
Olympic Games
Silver medal – second place	1992 Barcelona	Team
European Championship
Bronze medal – third place	1989 Sweden
Bronze medal – third place	1991 Germany

Arie Selinger (Hebrew: אריה סלינגר; born 5 April 1937) is an Israeli volleyball coach and former player. He is widely regarded as one of the greatest volleyball coaches of all time. He is credited with transforming the United States women's national volleyball team into a powerhouse in the 1980s.

In 1995, Selinger was inducted into the International Volleyball Hall of Fame.

== Israeli national team ==
Due to his athleticism and jumping ability, Selinger was on the Israel men's national volleyball team from 1954 to 1963.

== Coaching ==
=== United States women's team ===
Selinger served as the head coach of the United States women's national volleyball team from 1975 to 1984, a team that would go on to win the bronze medal in the 1982 FIVB World Championship in Peru and the silver medal in the 1984 Summer Olympics in Los Angeles. Among those coached by Selinger was the legendary volleyball player Flo Hyman.

=== The Netherlands men's team ===
Selinger also won the silver medal as coach for the Netherlands men's volleyball team at the 1992 Summer Olympics in Barcelona.

=== Japanese women's team ===
Selinger coached the Japanese women's national volleyball team from 1992 to 2006.

== Personal life ==
Selinger was born in Poland, and during World War II was in the Bergen-Belsen concentration camp from 1942 to 1945 before being liberated by Allied forces.

Selinger is the father of retired Dutch volleyball player and coach Avital Selinger.

== Bibliography ==
- Power Volleyball (St Martin's Press, 1987)

== See also ==
- List of select Jewish volleyball players
