= Roberto Piazza (volleyball coach) =

Italian volleyball player and coach

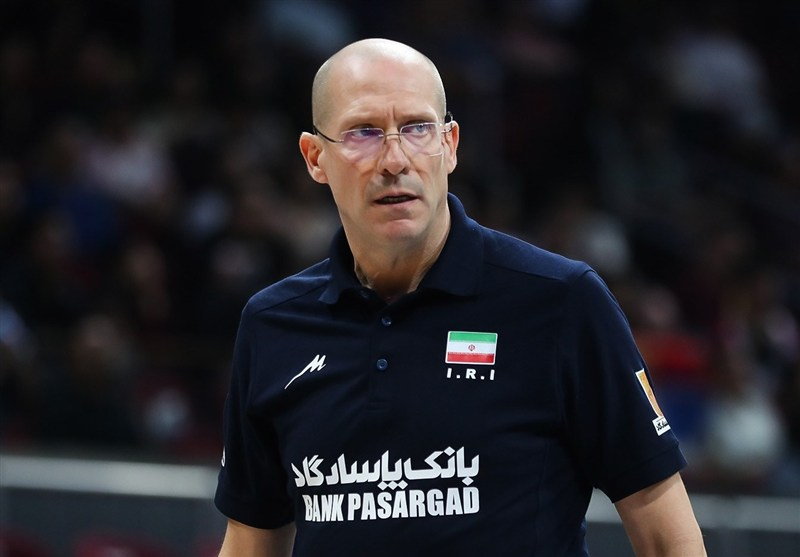
- Roberto Piazza as head coach of Iran

Personal information
- Born: 29 January 1968 (age 58) Parma, Italy
- Height: 1.90 m (6 ft 3 in)

Coaching information
- Current team: Projekt Warsaw
- Previous teams coached
- Years: Teams
- 1990–1996 1996–2007 2007–2009 2009–2012 2012–2014 2014–2015 2015–2016 2016 2016–2017 2017–2019 2019–2024 2019–2026 2025–2026 2026–: Pallavolo Parma (AC); Volley Treviso (AC); Dynamo Moscow (AC); Volley Treviso; Piemonte Volley; Jastrzębski Węgiel; Olympiacos; Qatar; Modena Volley; Skra Bełchatów; Netherlands; Power Volley Milano; Iran; Projekt Warsaw

Volleyball information
- Position: Middle blocker

Career
- Years: Team
- 1987–1989: Maxicono Parma

Roberto Piazza (born 29 January 1968) is an Italian professional volleyball coach and former player. He serves as head coach for Projekt Warsaw.

== Honours ==
=== As a player ===
- CEV Cup
  - 1987–88 – with Maxicono Parma
  - 1988–89 – with Maxicono Parma

=== As a coach ===
- CEV Champions League
  - 2012–13 – with Bre Banca Lannutti Cuneo
- CEV Cup
  - 2010–11 – with Sisley Treviso
- CEV Challenge Cup
  - 2020–21 – with Allianz Powervolley Milano
- Domestic
  - 2015–16 Greek Cup, with Olympiacos
  - 2016–17 Italian SuperCup, with Azimut Modena
  - 2017–18 Polish SuperCup, with PGE Skra Bełchatów
  - 2017–18 Polish Championship, with PGE Skra Bełchatów
  - 2018–19 Polish SuperCup, with PGE Skra Bełchatów

Sporting positions
Preceded by (Netherlands) Gido Vermeulen	Head coach of the Netherlands; 2019–2024	Succeeded by (England) Joel Banks
