= Zinnetullah Ahsen Böre =

Publisher of the first Finnish translation of the Quran (1886–1945)

Zinnetullah Ahsen Böre Зиннәтулла Әхсән Бүре
- Born: Зиннатулла Имадутдинов; March 20, 1886; Aktuk, Sergachsky Uyezd, Nizhny Novgorod Governorate, Russian Empire
- Died: November 9, 1945 (aged 59); Tampere, Finland
- Resting place: Helsinki
- Citizenship: Turkey
- Notable work: First Finnish language Quran (1942)
- Spouse(s): 1; Katiye, 2; Mürside, 3; Safiye
- Children: 9; of which all four boys were hockey players Feyzi, Murat, Zeyd, Vasif
- Parent(s): İmadetdin, Merhaba
- Relatives: 8 siblings

Zinnetullah Ahsen Böre (Tatar: Зиннәтулла Әхсән Бүре - né Imadutdinoff, Имадутдинов; March 20, 1886 - November 9, 1945) was a publisher, businessman, and imam among the Tatar community in Finland. Ahsen Böre is known as the publisher of the first Finnish translation of the Quran. He had his own successful shop in Tampere, which sold fabrics and furs. Ahsen Böre was a tenacious spokesperson of a "Turkish identity" for the Tatars. He eventually acquired Turkish citizenship. His four sons were all hockey players, most notably Feyzi Ahsen-Böre.

== Biography ==
Zinnätulla Imadutdinoff (later Ahsen Böre) was born on March 20, 1886, in a Mishar Tatar village called Aktuk, which was located in Nizhny Novgorod Governorate, Russian Empire. His parents were father Imadütdin (İmadetdin; 1849-1906) and mother Merhaba (Märxabä; 1855-1941). The father of Ahsen Böre was, according to him, a peasant who was illiterate, but a faithful man who never missed his daily duty of Salah. Ahsen Böre learned trading from him and in 1903, went to Saint Petersburg the first time as a merchant himself. While his father did always remind him of the importance of righteousness, Ahsen Böre credits the local imam of his village, a man named Abdulvahap for his religious upbringing. In his memoirs, he remembers the imam as someone who could bring great clarity into difficult questions he might have had regarding the subject.

In 1906, Ahsen Böre moved to Viipuri (Vyborg). In there, he continued his profession as a merchant and also operated as an imam to a small local Muslim community. In 1910 he moved to Terijoki (Zelenogorsk), where he and his younger brothers set up a shop that sold fabrics and furs. In 1916, Ahsen Böre graduated as an imam from Ufa.

During the Finnish Civil War (1918), Ahsen Böre was a prisoner of "the reds" at the Terijoki railway station, and during this time his possessions were stolen. After he was freed, he escaped to Saint Petersburg, but soon had to came back to Terijoki. The closing of the border weakened the business opportunities at Terijoki, and therefore Ahsen Böre moved with his family to Helsinki in 1919. During those times, some fellow Tatar activists and for example Finnish professor Yrjö Jahnsson started the pursuits for the independence of the minorities of Russia, but Ahsen Böre thought it was all hopeless and was against it fiercely. Due to the many conflicts that ensued, he eventually was deported from Helsinki. In June 1920 he moved to Tampere with his family. In 1922, Ahsen Böre applied for Finnish citizenship but was not able to get one. Eventually, in the late 1920s, he became a citizen of Turkey.

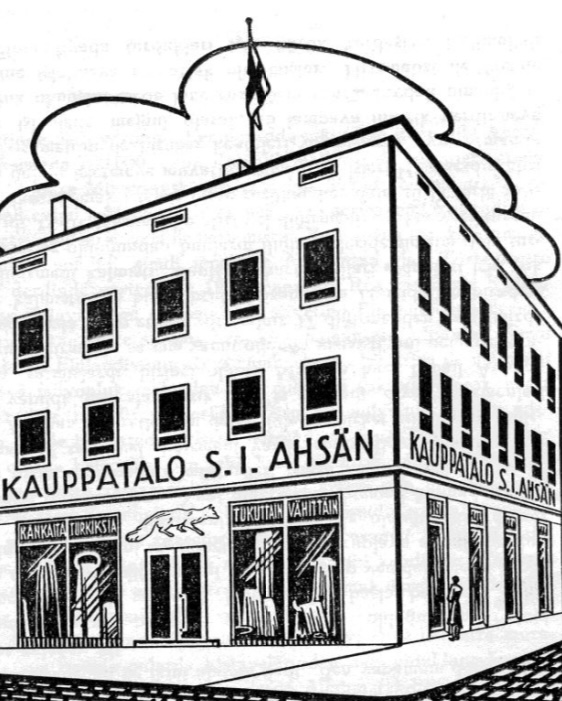
Shop of Ahsen Böre, in a Tampere street Kirkkokatu, where it was relocated in 1935.

In 1922, Ahsen Böre established a shop in Tampere, which once again focused on selling fabrics and furs. Before becoming a Turkish citizen, Ahsen Böre had a Nansen passport, which he used to make business trips for example to London and Leipzig. He acquired products to his shop from foreign producers; such as costume fabrics from England, textiles from France, lace fabric from Belgium, furs and textiles from Germany, carpets from Turkey and textiles from Japan.

Ahsen Böre refused to identify as a Tatar, instead thinking of himself as a "Volga Turk". As a citizen of Turkey, he was inspired by Mustafa Kemal Atatürk's nationalism and in the footsteps of Turkey, he was in favor of replacing the Arabic script with the Latin script in his native language. Not everyone in the Finnish Tatar community was so enthusiastic about the idea, but some were, and especially a bit later, the reform spread all throughout the community.

From 1928 on, Ahsen Böre also rallied for the establishment of a school for the Tatars, or as he put it, Turks of Finland. This dream of his materialized only after his death. The school operated in Helsinki for 21 years and though it used the name "Turk" (fin. Turkkilainen kansakoulu), it mostly taught Tatar language, not Turkish.

In 1931, Ahsen Böre published a Finnish translation of Lord Headley's work which focused on Islam. In 1936, Ahsen Böre started the process of translating the Quran to Finnish. The official translator of the text was Russian-born Georg Pimenoff and the proofreading was done by the Finnish school principal Jussi Ahtinen-Karsikko, but Ahsen Böre himself also used a lot of his time for the process, and according to fellow Tatar Hasan Hamidulla, sacrificed his health during it. The Quran was published in 1942. In the preface of the publication, Ahsen Böre spoke of the Finns in positive light; "During my time in Finland i have noticed that the Finns are enlightened and want to get the right picture of everything". Mannerheim thanked Ahsen Böre for distributing the Quran among the Muslim soldiers.

Ahsen Böre died at his home in Tampere on November 9, 1945. He was buried at the Tatar cemetery in Helsinki.

== Family ==
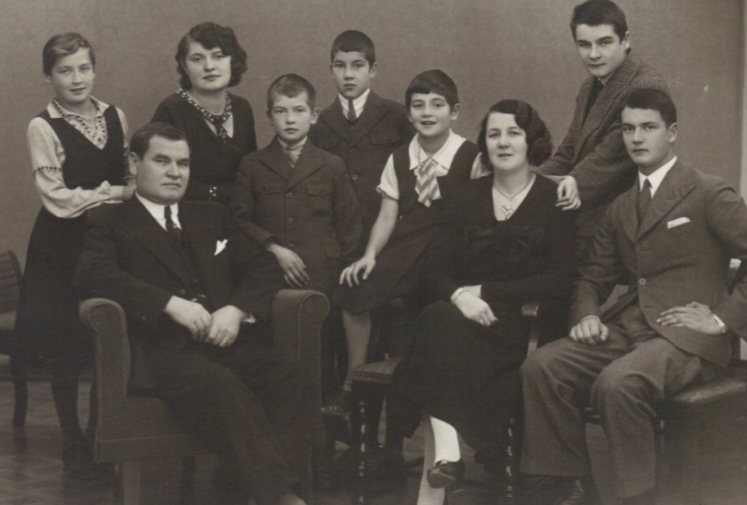
Family portrait, 1935 - from left; Zekiye, Zinnetullah, Gulanber, Vasif, Zeyd, Rusane, Safiye, Murat, Feyzi.

Zinnetullah Ahsen Böre was married three times. His first wife was Katiye Ziadetdin, his second wife Mürside Bedretdin and his third Safiye Kemaletdin. From his first marriage, he had two daughters, Saadetbanu and Afife, and from his second marriage he had one daughter, Gülanber. From the third marriage Ahsen Böre had two daughters and four boys. The daughters were Zekiye and Rusane, and the boys were hockey players Feyzi, Murat, Zeyd and Vasif. Feyzi also worked as a bookseller in Istanbul later in his life and in 1972, published the first Turkish-Finnish-dictionary. Murat Ahsen Böre operated his fathers shop after his death.

Ahsen Böre had eight siblings; Fettehutdin, Halime, Zahidullah, Halise, Abdullah, Abdulkayoom, Abdülhak, Katiye. (Halise and Abdulkayoom died when they were little.)

== Name ==
Zinnətulla Әxsən Büre
Bulat Şəymi, Kazan 2023.

In Literary Tatar: Зиннәтулла Әхсән Бүре; Zinnätulla Äxsän / Zinnətulla Әxsən Büre, born Ğimadetdinov / Зиннәтулла Гыймадетдинов - Mishar Dialect: İmadetdinov, Russian: Imadutdinov.

Ahsen Böre is known to have used the following versions of his name:

- Zinnätulla, Zinetullah, Zinnetullah
- Ahsän Böre, Ahsen Böre
- Imadütdin, Imadutdinoff, Aimadetdinoff, Imadütdinoglu

Original surname of Ahsen Böre (Imadutdinoff) was his patronym. Ahsen was the name of his grandfather. Böre (Büre: wolf) on the other hand a nickname that over the years solidified as a family name.

== Sources ==
- Bedretdin, Kadriye: Tugan Tel: Kirjoituksia Suomen tataareista. Suomen Itämainen Seura, 2011. ISBN 978-951-9380-78-0
- Leitzinger, Antero: Mishäärit - Suomen vanha islamilainen yhteisö. Kirja-Leitzinger, 1996, Helsinki. ISBN 952-9752-08-3
