= Ekrem Lagumdžija =

Bosnian volleyball player (born 1965)

Personal information
- Nationality: Bosnian
- Born: 10 March 1965 (age 61); Sarajevo, SFR Yugoslavia
- Height: 2.06 m (6 ft 9 in)

Volleyball information
- Position: Outside hitter

Career
Years	Teams
1985–1988; 1988–1992; 1992–1995; 1995–1996; 1996–1997; 2001–2002	SOK Mostar; Vojvodina Novi Sad; Aris Thessaloniki; Jeans Hatù Bologna; AEK Athens; OK Sinpos

National team
1989–1993; 1995–1997	Yugoslavia; FR Yugoslavia

Ekrem Lagumdžija (Serbian Cyrillic: Екрем Лагумџија; born 10 March 1965) is a Bosniak former professional volleyball player who plays as an outside hitter for the Yugoslavia national team.

He has a volleyball academy named SMEČ which is connected to VakıfBank Volleyball Academy in Sarajevo.

== Personal life ==
His sons Adis Lagumdžija and Mirza Lagumdžija also play volleyball and both are play for Turkey national team because there was no Bosnia and Herzegovina men's national volleyball team.

== Honours ==
=== Club ===
- Yugoslavia Championship
  - 1988–89 with Vojvodina Novi Sad
  - 1990–91 with Vojvodina Novi Sad
  - 1989–90 with Vojvodina Novi Sad
- Serbia and Montenegro Championship
  - 1991–92 with Vojvodina Novi Sad
- Yugoslavia Cup
  - 1988, 1990, 1991 with Vojvodina Novi Sad
- Serbia and Montenegro Cup
  - 1991–92 with Vojvodina Novi Sad
- Greek Volleyball League
  - 1993–94 with Aris Thessaloniki
  - 1992–93 with Aris Thessaloniki

=== International ===
- Mediterranean Games
  - 1991

=== Individual awards ===
- 1991: European Championship – Best spiker
