= Albert Cristina =

Dutch volleyball player (born 1970)

Personal information
- Full name: Albert Maximo Cristina
- Born: 18 November 1970 (age 55); Curaçao, Dutch Antilles
- Height: 194 cm (6 ft 4 in)

Volleyball information
- Position: Middle blocker
- Number: 15 (2000); 18 (2004)

National team
1997-2007	Netherlands
Honours
Men's volleyball
Representing the Netherlands
World League
Bronze medal – third place	1998 Milan
World Grand Champions Cup
Silver medal – second place	1997 Japan
European Championships
Gold medal – first place	1997 Netherlands

Albert Maximo Cristina (born 18 November 1970, in Curaçao, Dutch Antilles) is a retired volleyball player from the Netherlands, who represented his native country at two consecutive Summer Olympics, starting in 2000. After having finished in fifth place in Sydney, Australia, he ended up in ninth place with the Dutch Men's National Team four years later in Athens, Greece.
