= Murat Ahsen-Böre =

Finnish ice hockey player

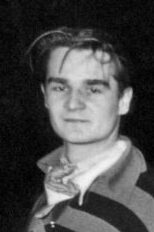
- Born: September 20, 1919; Helsinki, Finland
- Died: 1968
- Position: Forward
- Shot: Left
- Played for: SM-sarja; Ilves; HJK Helsinki
- Playing career: 1935–1943

Murat Ahsen-Böre (Tatar: Морат Әхсән Бүре, Morat Äxsän Büre; September 20, 1919 – 1968) was a Finnish ice hockey player. He began his career with Ilves in 1935, and remained with the team until 1938. He later returned to play one season with HJK Helsinki. His brothers Feyzi, Zeyd, and Vasif were also hockey players. Their father was the Tatar businessman Zinnetullah Ahsen Böre.

== Career statistics ==
			Regular Season					Playoffs
Season	Team	League	GP	G	A	Pts	PIM	GP	G	A	Pts	PIM
1935-36	Ilves	SM-sarja	6	0	0	0	0	--	--	--	--	--
1936-37	Ilves	SM-sarja	6	0	1	1	0	--	--	--	--	--
1937-38	Ilves	SM-sarja	4	2	0	2	0	--	--	--	--	--
1942-43	HJK Helsinki	SM-sarja	7	1	1	2	0	--	--	--	--	--
