= Mirza Lagumdžija =

Bosnian volleyball player (born 2001)

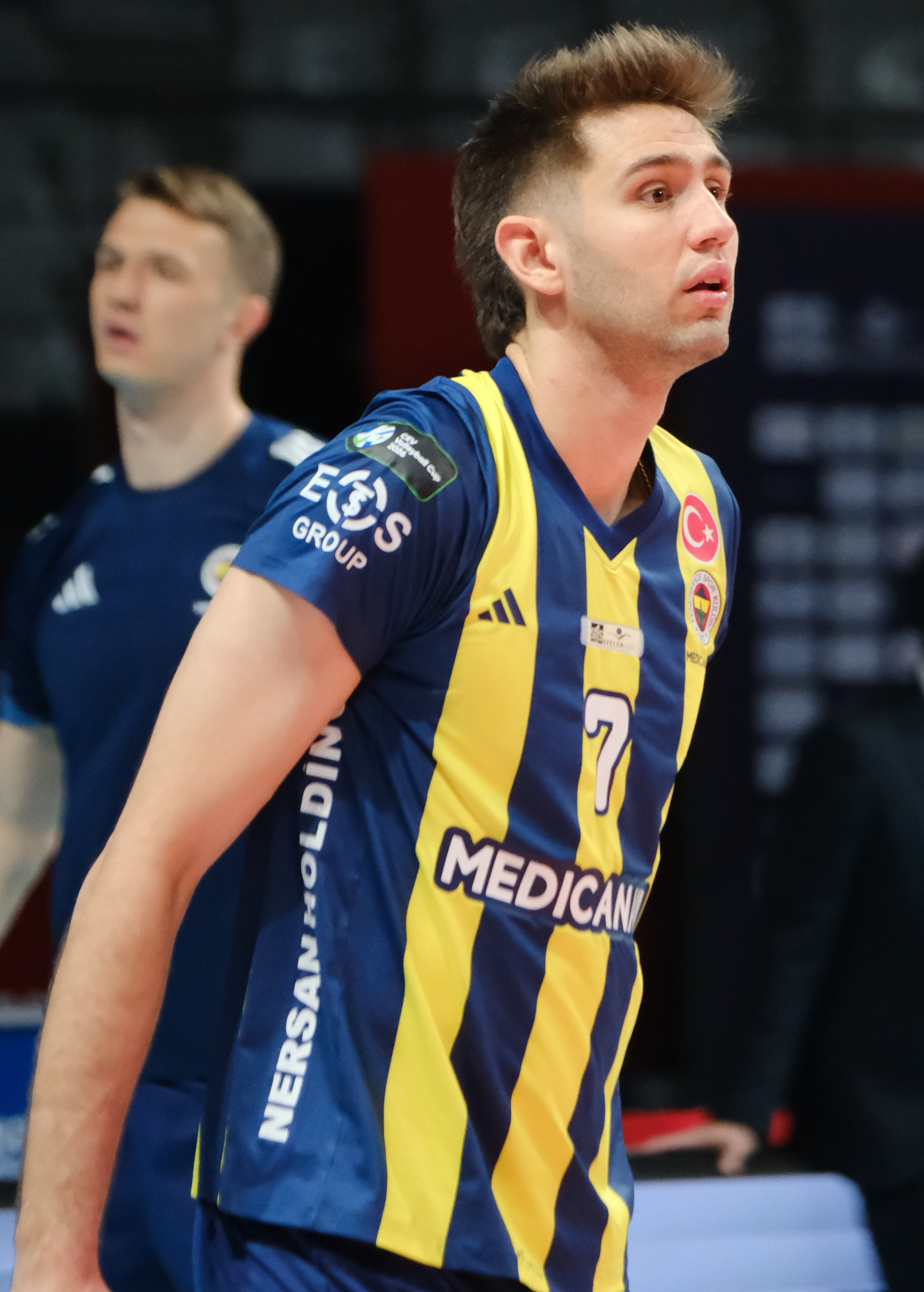

Personal information
- Nationality: Turkish / Bosnian
- Born: 18 May 2001 (age 25); Sarajevo, Bosnia and Herzegovina
- Height: 2.07 m (6 ft 9 in)
- Weight: 83 kg (183 lb)
- Spike: 360 cm (142 in)
- Block: 335 cm (132 in)

Volleyball information
- Position: Outside hitter
- Current club: Fenerbahçe
- Number: 7

Career
Years	Teams
2017–2018; 2018–2023; 2023–2025; 2025–	Galatasaray; Arkas İzmir; Halkbank; Fenerbahçe

National team
2021–	Turkey
Honours
Men's volleyball
Representing Turkey
FIVB Challenger Cup
Gold medal – first place	2023 Doha
European League
Gold medal – first place	2021 Belgium
Gold medal – first place	2023 Belgium

Mirza Lagumdžija (born 18 May 2001) is a Bosnian professional volleyball player who plays as an outside hitter for Fenerbahçe. He represents Turkey internationally.

== Personal life ==
His father, Ekrem Lagumdžija, is a former volleyball player. His elder brother Adis Lagumdžija also plays volleyball for Fenerbahçe.

== International ==
He and his elder brother Adis Lagumdžija, chose the Turkey national team because there was no Bosnia and Herzegovina men's national volleyball team.

== Honours ==
=== Club ===
- (Turkey) Galatasaray (2017–2018)
- (Turkey) Arkas İzmir (2018–2023)
  - Turkish League: 2018–19
  - Turkish Cup 2022
- (Turkey) Halkbank (2023–2025)
  - CEV Cup: 2023–24
  - Turkish League: 2023–24
  - Turkish Cup 2024 2025

=== Individual awards ===
- 2019: U18 BVA Cup - Most valuable player
- 2022: U22 CEV European Championship – Best attacker
- 2023: Turkish League – Best hitter
