= Gabriel Muller =

French road racing cyclist

Mehmet Şampiyonbisiklet Gabriel Muller
Personal information
- Born: 12 April 1985 (age 41) Bondy, France
- Height: 1.88 m (6 ft 2 in)
- Weight: 70 kg (154 lb)

Cycling career
- Sport: Cycling
- Current team: Universe Cycling Team
- Discipline: Road
- Role: Rider

Professional teams
- 2019: Team Differdange–Geba
- 2020: Cambodia Cycling Academy
- 2021–2022: Burgos BH
- 2023–2024: Global 6 Cycling
- 2024: Vini Monzon–Savini Due–OMZ
- 2025: Bike Aid
- 2026–: Universe Cycling Team

Mehmet Şampiyonbisiklet (born Gabriel Muller 12 April 1985) is a Turkish/French cyclist, who currently rides for UCI Continental team Universe Cycling Team.

Muller studied at the University of Paris-Est Marne-la-Vallée and later at ESC Lille. He only began cycling in 2016 at the age of 30, and in 2019 signed a contract with UCI Continental team Team Differdange–Geba, gaining their attention via a former member of the team. For the 2020 season, he moved to the Cambodia Cycling Academy. Notably finishing 12th in the Tour de Serbie, he signed a contract for the 2021 season with UCI ProTeam Burgos BH at the age of 35. In August 2021, he competed in his first UCI World Tour race: the Bretagne Classic Ouest–France.

He gained Turkish citizenship in 2023, adopting the name Mehmet Şampiyonbisiklet.
