= Adis Lagumdžija =

Bosnian volleyball player (born 1999)

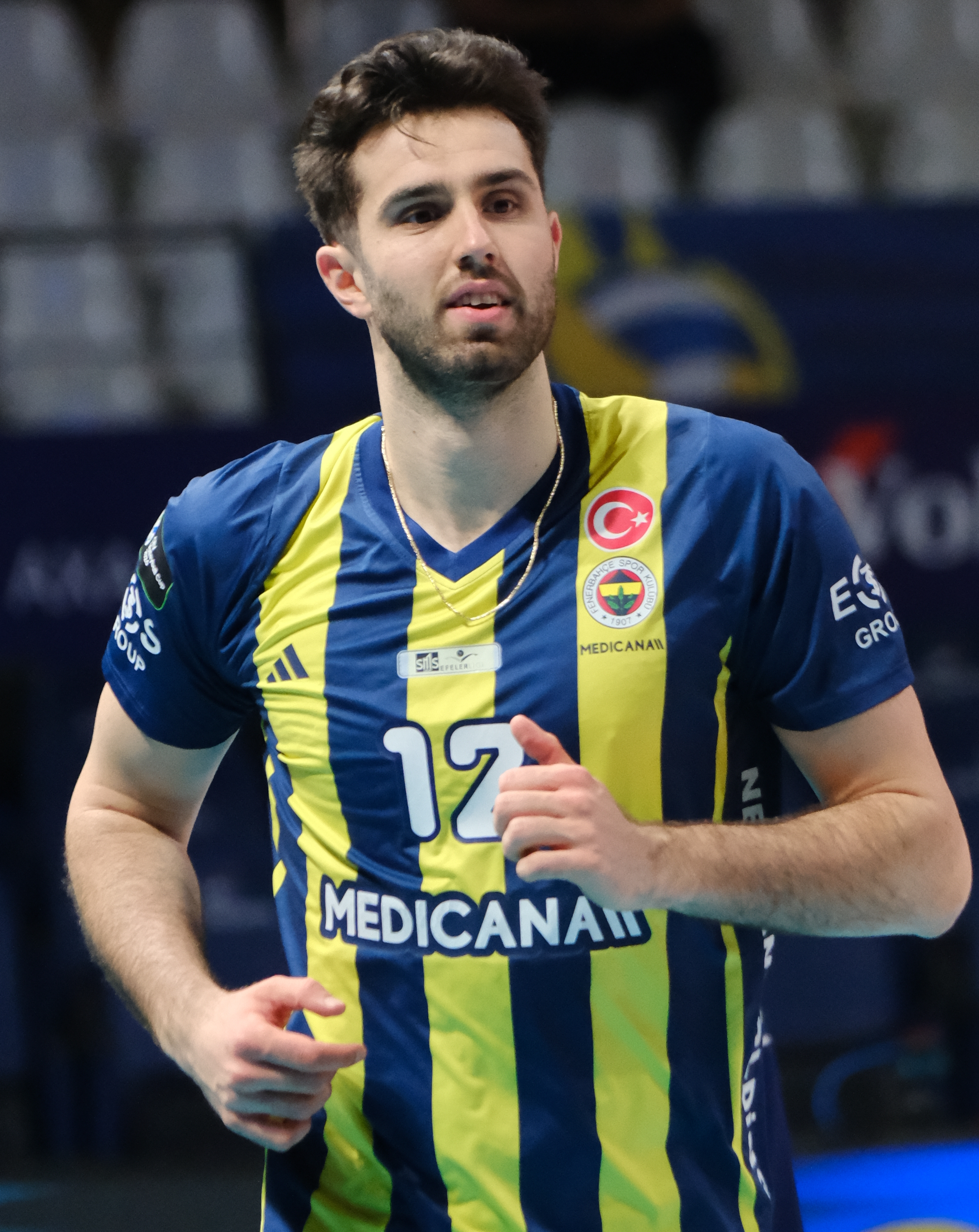

Personal information
- Nationality: Turkish / Bosnian
- Born: 29 March 1999 (age 27); Sarajevo, Bosnia and Herzegovina
- Height: 2.11 m (6 ft 11 in)
- Weight: 109 kg (240 lb)
- Spike: 365 cm (144 in)
- Block: 340 cm (134 in)

Volleyball information
- Position: Opposite
- Current club: (Turkey) Fenerbahçe
- Number: 12

Career
Years	Teams
2016–2017; 2017–2020; 2020–2021; 2021–2022; 2022–2023; 2023–2025; 2025–	(Turkey) Galatasaray (Turkey) Arkas İzmir (Italy) Vero Volley Monza (Italy) Gas Sales Piacenza (Italy) Valsa Group Modena (Italy) Cucine Lube Civitanova (Turkey) Fenerbahçe

National team
2018–	Turkey
Honours
Men's volleyball
Representing Turkey
FIVB Challenger Cup
Gold medal – first place	2023 Doha
Silver medal – second place	2022 Seoul
European League
Gold medal – first place	2019 Estonia
Gold medal – first place	2021 Belgium
Gold medal – first place	2023 Croatia
Bronze medal – third place	2018 Czech Republic

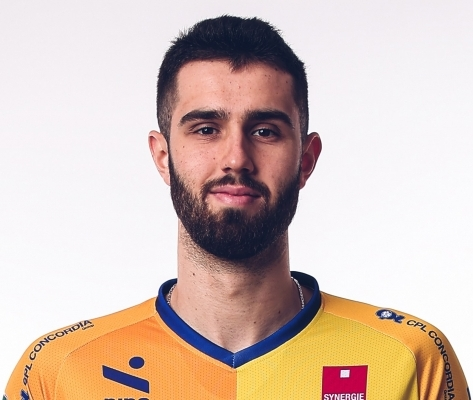

Adis Lagumdžija (born 29 March 1999) is a Bosnian professional volleyball player who plays as an opposite spiker for Fenerbahçe. He represents Turkey internationally.

== Personal life ==
His father, Ekrem Lagumdžija, is a former volleyball player. His younger brother Mirza Lagumdžija also plays volleyball for Fenerbahçe.

== International ==
He and his brother Mirza Lagumdžija, chose the Turkey national team because there was no Bosnia and Herzegovina men's national volleyball team.

== Honours ==
=== Club ===
- (Turkey) Galatasaray (2016–2017)
  - CEV Challenge Cup: 2016–17
  - BVA Cup; 2016
- (Turkey) Arkas İzmir (2017–2020)
  - Turkish League: 2017–18, 2018–19
- (Italy) Vero Volley Monza (2020–2021)
- (Italy) Gas Sales Piacenza (2021–2022)
  - Italian Cup: 2022
- (Italy) Valsa Group Modena (2022–2023)
  - CEV Cup: 2022–23
- (Italy) Cucine Lube Civitanova (2023–2025)
  - CEV Champions League: 2023–24
  - CEV Challenge Cup: 2024–25
  - Italian Serie A1: 2024–25
  - Italian Cup: 2025
  - Italian Super Cup: 2023

=== Individual awards ===
- 2017: CEV U19 European Championship – Most valuable player
- 2017: CEV U19 European Championship – Best scorer
- 2018: Turkish League – Most valuable player
- 2019: Turkish League – Best spiker
- 2020: CEV Cup – Best scorer
- 2021: European League – Most Improving Player
- 2023: CEV Cup – Most valuable player
- 2023: CEV Cup – Best scorer
- 2023: SuperLega – Best scorer
- 2024: SuperLega – Best server
