= Netherlands men's national volleyball team =

Netherlands
- Nickname(s): Orange
- Association: Nederlandse Volleybalbond (Nevobo)
- Confederation: CEV
- Head coach: Joel Banks
- FIVB ranking: 21 (3 August 2026)

Uniforms
Home	Away	Third

Summer Olympics
- Appearances: 6 (First in 1964)
- Best result: (1996)

World Championship
- Appearances: 14 (First in 1949)
- Best result: (silver) (1994)

World Cup
- Appearances: 2 (First in 1965)
- Best result: (1995)

European Championship
- Appearances: 26 (First in 1948)
- Best result: (gold) (1997)
- www.volleybal.nl (in Dutch)
Honours
Olympics
Gold medal – first place	1996 Atlanta	Team
Silver medal – second place	1992 Barcelona	Team
World Championship
Silver medal – second place	1994 Greece	Team
World Cup
Silver medal – second place	1995 Japan
World Grand Champions Cup
Silver medal – second place	1997 Japan
World League
Gold medal – first place	1996 Rotterdam
Silver medal – second place	1990 Osaka
Bronze medal – third place	1998 Milan
European Championship
Gold medal – first place	1997 Eindhoven
Silver medal – second place	1993 Turku
Silver medal – second place	1995 Athens
Bronze medal – third place	1989 Stockholm
Bronze medal – third place	1991 Berlin

The Netherlands men's national volleyball team represents the Netherlands in FIVB tournaments. Volleyball is the most popular indoor sport in the country, with over 125,000 associates. The team had their most successful phase beginning in the 1990s under coaches Arie Selinger and Joop Alberda, reaching various finals for international tournaments and winning both the Olympic Games and the World League in 1996. Netherlands in World Championship won silver medal 1994 in Greece.

== Competition record ==
=== Olympic Games ===
Champions Runners up

Olympics Games record
Year	Round	Position	GP	MW	ML	SW	SL	Squad
(Japan) 1964	Round robin	8th	9	2	7	11	24	Squad
(Mexico) 1968	Did not qualify							
(West Germany) 1972	Did not qualify							
(Canada) 1976	Did not qualify							
(Soviet Union) 1980	Did not qualify							
(United States) 1984	Did not qualify							
(South Korea) 1988	Final round	5th	7	5	2	16	9	Squad
(Spain) 1992	Final	2nd	8	4	4	14	14	Squad
(United States) 1996	Final	1st	8	7	1	21	6	Squad
(Australia) 2000	Quarterfinals	5th	6	4	2	14	8	Squad
(Greece) 2004	First round	9th	5	2	3	7	11	Squad
(China) 2008	Did not qualify							
(United Kingdom) 2012	Did not qualify							
(Brazil) 2016	Did not qualify							
(Japan) 2020	Did not qualify							
(France) 2024	Did not qualify							
(United States) 2028	To be determined							
(Australia) 2032	To be determined							
Total	1 Title	6/18	45	26	19	89	72	—

=== World Championship ===
Year	Result	GP	MW	ML	SW	SL	PW	PL
(Czechoslovakia) 1949	10th place	0	0	0	0	0	0	0
(Soviet Union) 1952	did not qualify							
(France) 1956	13th place	0	0	0	0	0	0	0
(Brazil) 1960	did not qualify							
(Soviet Union) 1962	12th place	0	0	0	0	0	0	0
(Czechoslovakia) 1966	12th place	0	0	0	0	0	0	0
(Bulgaria) 1970	14th place	0	0	0	0	0	0	0
(Mexico) 1974	12th place	0	0	0	0	0	0	0
(Italy) 1978	16th place	9	4	5	0	0	0	0
(Argentina) 1982	did not qualify							
(France) 1986	did not qualify							
(Brazil) 1990	7th place	7	4	3	16	10	335	264
(Greece) 1994	Silver medal	7	5	2	16	10	154	118
(Japan) 1998	6th place	10	7	3	21	12	417	351
(Argentina) 2002	9th place	6	4	2	12	11	503	497
(Japan) 2006	did not qualify							
(Italy) 2010	did not qualify							
(Poland) 2014	did not qualify							
(Italy) (Bulgaria) 2018	8th place	8	5	3	16	15	692	661
(Poland) (Slovenia) 2022	10th place	4	3	1	9	6	339	325
(Philippines) 2025	13th place	4	2	2	8	7	354	362
(Poland) 2027	To be determined							
(Qatar) 2029	To be determined							
Total	14/23	0	0	0	0	0	0	0

=== FIVB World Cup ===
Year	Result	Pld	W	L	SW	SL	PW	PL
(Poland) 1965	10th place	6	1	5	8	15	256	496
(East Germany) 1969	did not qualify							
(Japan) 1977	did not qualify							
(Japan) 1981	did not qualify							
(Japan) 1985	did not qualify							
(Japan) 1989	did not qualify							
(Japan) 1991	did not qualify							
(Japan) 1995	Silver medal	11	9	2	30	7	522	344
(Japan) 1999	did not qualify							
(Japan) 2003	did not qualify							
(Japan) 2007	did not qualify							
(Japan) 2011	did not qualify							
(Japan) 2015	did not qualify							
(Japan) 2019	did not qualify							
Total	2/14	17	10	7	38	22	778	840

=== World Grand Champions Cup ===
Year	Result	Pld	W	L	SW	SL	PW	PL
(Japan) 1993	did not advance							
(Japan) 1997	Silver medal	5	3	2	12	9	289	287
(Japan) 2001	did not advance							
(Japan) 2005	did not advance							
(Japan) 2009	did not advance							
(Japan) 2013	did not advance							
(Japan) 2017	did not advance							
Total	1/7	5	3	2	12	9	289	287

=== FIVB World League ===
World League record
Year	Result	GP	MW	ML	SW	SL	PW	PL
(Japan) 1990	Silver medal	0	0	0	0	0	0	0
(Italy) 1991	Silver medal	0	0	0	0	0	0	0
(Italy) 1992	4th place	0	0	0	0	0	0	0
(Brazil) 1993	5th place	0	0	0	0	0	0	0
(Italy) 1994	5th place	0	0	0	0	0	0	0
(Brazil) 1995	12th place	0	0	0	0	0	0	0
(Netherlands) 1996	Gold medal	0	0	0	0	0	0	0
(Russia) 1997	4th place	0	0	0	0	0	0	0
(Italy) 1998	Bronze medal	0	0	0	0	0	0	0
(Argentina) 1999	10th place	0	0	0	0	0	0	0
(Netherlands) 2000	5th place	0	0	0	0	0	0	0
(Poland) 2001	7th place	0	0	0	0	0	0	0
(Brazil) 2002	7th place	0	0	0	0	0	0	0
(Spain) 2003	10th place	0	0	0	0	0	0	0
(Italy) 2004	did not qualify							
(Serbia and Montenegro) 2005	did not qualify							
(Russia) 2006	did not qualify							
(Poland) 2007	did not qualify							
(Brazil) 2008	did not qualify							
(Serbia) 2009	12th place	0	0	0	0	0	0	0
(Argentina) 2010	12th place	0	0	0	0	0	0	0
(Poland) 2011	did not qualify							
(Poland) 2012	did not qualify							
(Argentina) 2013	14th place	0	0	0	0	0	0	0
(Italy) 2014	12th place	0	0	0	0	0	0	0
(Brazil) 2015	13th place	0	0	0	0	0	0	0
(Poland) 2016	15th place	0	0	0	0	0	0	0
(Brazil) 2017	16th place	0	0	0	0	0	0	0
Total	21/28	0	0	0	0	0	0	0

=== Nations League ===
Nations League record
Year	Rank	GP	MW	ML	SW	SL	PW	PL	Squad
(France) 2018	Did not enter (Note: Participated in the European League)								
(United States) 2019	Did not enter								
(Italy) 2021	14th	15	3	12	19	40	1214	1354	Squad
(Italy) 2022	8th	13	6	7	21	24	997	1028	Squad
(Poland) 2023	10th	12	5	7	22	24	1028	1054	Squad
(Poland) 2024	13th	12	3	9	17	31	1057	1107	Squad
(China) 2025	18th	12	1	11	11	34	942	1068	Squad
(China) 2026	Did not qualify								
(N/A) 2027	Did not qualify								
Total	5/9	64	18	46	90	153	5238	5611	—

=== European Championship ===
European Championship record
Year	Position	GP	MW	ML	SW	SL	PW	PL	Squad
(Italy) 1948	6th	5	0	5	1	15	109	232	—N/a
(Bulgaria) 1950	Did not enter								
(France) 1951	9th	6	1	5	4	17	206	296	—N/a
(Romania) 1955	Did not enter								
(Czechoslovakia) 1958	13th	11	3	8	21	37	573	615	—N/a
(Romania) 1963	12th	8	5	3	29	15	458	368	—N/a
(Turkey) 1967	15th	10	2	8	13	24	397	439	Squad
(Italy) 1971	9th	8	4	4	14	15	353	355	Squad
(Socialist Federal Republic of Yugoslavia) 1975	9th	7	3	4	11	16	293	358	Squad
(Finland) 1977	12th	7	0	7	3	21	198	348	Squad
(France) 1979	Did not qualify								
(Bulgaria) 1981	Did not qualify								
(East Germany) 1983	10th	7	2	5	9	15	285	312	Squad
(Netherlands) 1985	10th	7	3	4	12	15	309	324	Squad
(Belgium) 1987	5th	7	4	3	15	11	335	294	Squad
(Sweden) 1989	Bronze Medal	7	4	3	14	10	306	240	Squad
(Germany) 1991	Bronze Medal	7	5	2	15	9	295	247	Squad
(Finland) 1993	Silver Medal	7	5	2	18	7	320	248	Squad
(Greece) 1995	Silver Medal	7	6	1	20	3	336	186	Squad
(Netherlands) 1997	Gold Medal	7	7	0	21	1	326	164	Squad
(Austria) 1999	5th	5	3	2	11	9	472	446	Squad
(Czech Republic) 2001	8th	7	3	4	14	13	624	599	Squad
(Germany) 2003	6th	7	4	3	13	15	628	635	Squad
(Italy) (Serbia and Montenegro) 2005	11th	5	0	5	4	15	391	441	Squad
(Russia) 2007	7th	5	3	2	10	9	438	412	Squad
(Turkey) 2009	7th	5	2	3	10	12	504	505	Squad
(Austria) (Czech Republic) 2011	Did not qualify								
(Denmark) (Poland) 2013	10th	4	1	3	7	10	363	390	Squad
(Bulgaria) (Italy) 2015	9th	4	2	2	8	9	374	380	Squad
(Poland) 2017	14th	3	0	3	3	9	263	285	Squad
(France) (Slovenia) (Netherlands) (Belgium) 2019	10th	6	3	3	12	10	506	488	Squad
(Poland) (Finland) (Czech Republic) (Estonia) 2021	5th	7	5	2	17	10	623	611	Squad
(Italy) (Bulgaria) (North Macedonia) (Israel) 2023	5th	7	5	2	18	9	603	576	Squad
(Italy) (Bulgaria) (Finland) (Romania) 2026	23rd	5	0	5	6	15	433	485	Squad
(Montenegro) 2028	Qualified								
Total	27/34	188	85	103	353	376	11321	11279	—N/a

- 1997 Netherlands — Gold medal
  Peter Blangé, Albert Cristina, Robert van Es, Bas van de Goor, Mike van de Goor, Guido Görtzen, Jochem de Gruijter, Henk-Jan Held, Reinder Nummerdor

=== European League ===
European League record
Year	Result	GP	MW	ML	SW	SL	PW	PL
(Czech Republic) 2004	Bronze medal	14	11	3	37	23	1362	1278
(Russia) 2005	did not enter							
(Turkey) 2006	Gold medal	14	14	0	42	12	1270	1136
(Portugal) 2007	7th	12	6	6	23	22	988	1008
(Turkey) 2008	Silver medal	14	13	1	40	15	1289	1135
(Portugal) 2009	did not enter							
(Spain) 2010	did not enter							
(Slovakia) 2011	5th	12	9	3	28	16	1025	956
(Turkey) 2012	Gold medal	14	12	2	37	13	1181	1062
(Turkey) 2013	did not enter							
2014	did not enter							
(Poland) 2015	did not enter							
(Bulgaria) 2016	did not enter							
(Denmark) 2017	did not enter							
(Czech Republic) 2018	5th	6	4	2	16	12	631	563
(Estonia) 2019	Bronze medal	8	5	3	18	15	732	696
(Belgium) / (North Macedonia) 2021	Withdraw to replace China in the FIVB Nations League							
2022-2025	Competed in the FIVB Nations League							
(Finland) / (Netherlands) 2026	Silver medal	10	8	2	26	8	812	700
Total	9/22	104	82	22	267	136	9290	8534

== Team ==
=== Current squad ===
The following is the Dutch roster in the 2022 World Championship.

Head coach: (Italy) Roberto Piazza

No.	Name	Date of birth	Height	Weight	Spike	Block	2022–23 club
2	Wessel Keemink	29 May 1993	1.97 m (6 ft 6 in)	81 kg (179 lb)	337 cm (133 in)	326 cm (128 in)	(Czech Republic) VK ČEZ Karlovarsko
3	Maarten van Garderen	24 January 1990	2.00 m (6 ft 7 in)	89 kg (196 lb)	359 cm (141 in)	338 cm (133 in)	(Greece) PAOK Thessaloniki
4	Thijs ter Horst	18 September 1991	2.04 m (6 ft 8 in)	94 kg (207 lb)	364 cm (143 in)	344 cm (135 in)	(South Korea) KEPCO
5	Luuc van der Ent	27 July 1998	2.08 m (6 ft 10 in)	105 kg (231 lb)	359 cm (141 in)	351 cm (138 in)	(Germany) SWD Powervolleys Düren
7	Gijs Jorna	30 May 1989	1.96 m (6 ft 5 in)	85 kg (187 lb)	340 cm (130 in)	310 cm (120 in)	(Greece) PAOK Thessaloniki
8	Fabian Plak	23 July 1997	1.98 m (6 ft 6 in)	92 kg (203 lb)	357 cm (141 in)	341 cm (134 in)	(France) Chaumont Volley-Ball 52
12	Bennie Tuinstra	13 September 2000	2.00 m (6 ft 7 in)	90 kg (200 lb)	350 cm (140 in)	335 cm (132 in)	(Turkey) Ziraat Bankası
13	Mats Bleeker	7 May 1998	1.80 m (5 ft 11 in)	80 kg (180 lb)	320 cm (130 in)	315 cm (124 in)	(Netherlands) Active Living Orion
14	Nimir Abdel-Aziz (C)	5 February 1992	2.01 m (6 ft 7 in)	86 kg (190 lb)	365 cm (144 in)	350 cm (140 in)	(Turkey) Halkbank
16	Wouter ter Maat	7 May 1991	2.00 m (6 ft 7 in)	90 kg (200 lb)	351 cm (138 in)	338 cm (133 in)	(Turkey) Ziraatkbank
17	Michaël Parkinson	23 November 1991	2.03 m (6 ft 8 in)	98 kg (216 lb)	365 cm (144 in)	350 cm (140 in)	(Poland) Cerrad Enea Czarni Radom
18	Robbert Andringa	28 April 1990	1.92 m (6 ft 4 in)	85 kg (187 lb)	330 cm (130 in)	310 cm (120 in)	(Poland) AZS Olsztyn
19	Freek de Weijer	30 October 1995	1.91 m (6 ft 3 in)	93 kg (205 lb)	359 cm (141 in)	351 cm (138 in)	(Italy) Gas Sales Bluenergy Piacenza
22	Twan Wiltenburg	20 January 1997	2.05 m (6 ft 9 in)	86 kg (190 lb)	334 cm (131 in)	325 cm (128 in)	(Poland) ZAKSA

=== Coach history ===
- (Poland) Benedykt Krysik
- (Israel) Arie Selinger
- (Netherlands) Joop Alberda
- (Netherlands) Toon Gerbrands
- (Netherlands) Bert Goedkoop
- (Netherlands) Arie Cornelis Brokking
- (Netherlands) Peter Blangé
- (Netherlands) Edwin Benne
- (Netherlands) Gido Vermeulen
- (Italy) Roberto Piazza (2019–2024)
- (England) Joel Banks (2025–)

== Kit providers ==
The table below shows the history of kit providers for the Netherland national volleyball team.

Period	Kit provider
2000–	Mizuno; Erima; Erreà

=== Sponsorship ===
Primary sponsors include: main sponsors like Ilionx other sponsors: Lotto, Eilers Sport, Johan Cruyff Foundation, Zilveren Kruis, DELA. Voor Elkaar and BvdGF.
