= Mustafa Cengiz (volleyball) =

Turkish volleyball player (born 1998)

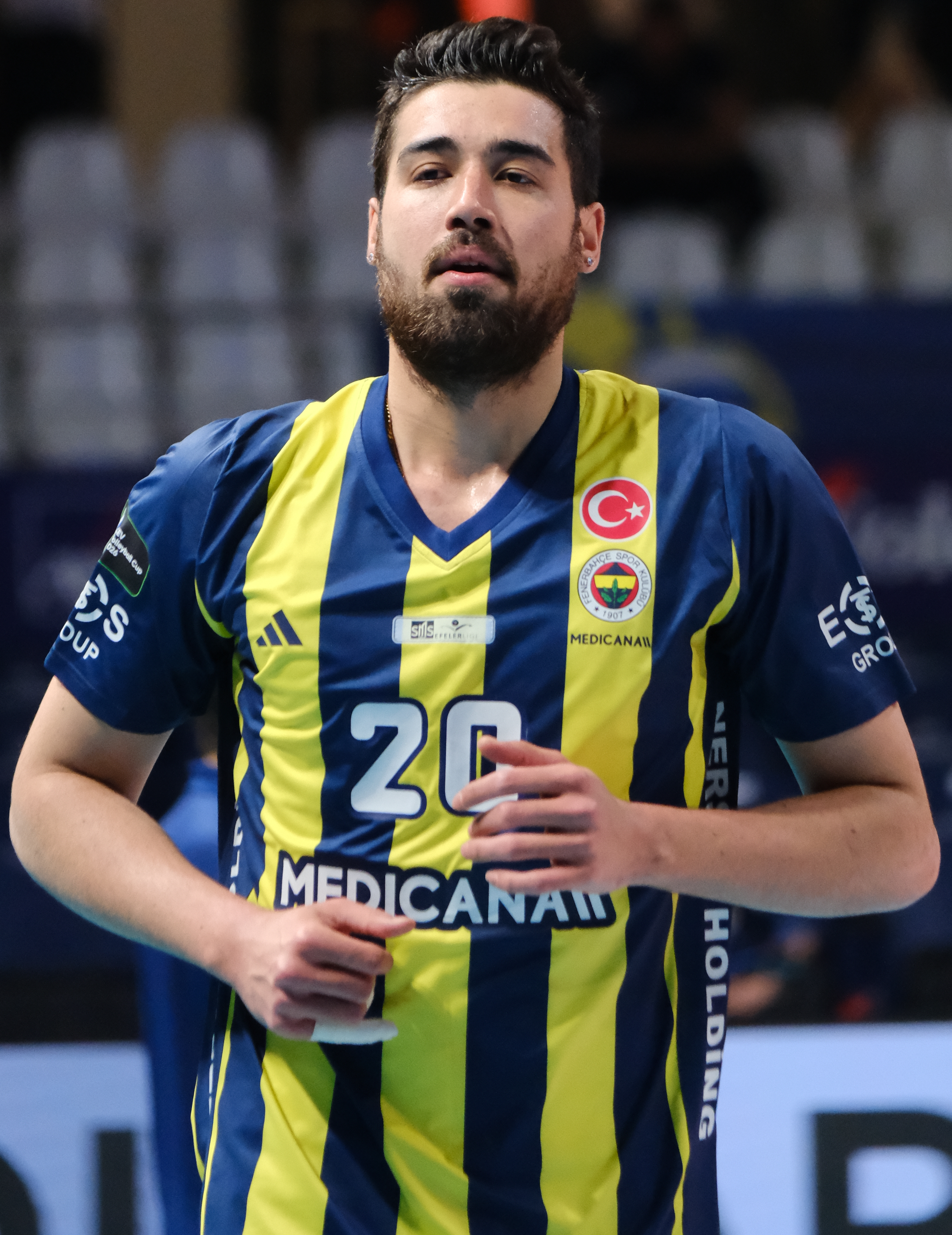

Personal information
- Nationality: (Turkey) Turkish
- Born: 29 May 1998 (age 28); Istanbul, Turkey
- Height: 2.09 m (6 ft 10 in)
- Weight: 85 kg (187 lb)
- Spike: 365 cm (144 in)
- Block: 340 cm (134 in)

Volleyball information
- Position: Middle blocker
- Current club: Fenerbahçe

Career
Years
- 2017–2023
- 2023–2025
- 2025–
Teams
- Arkas İzmir
- Spor Toto Spor Kulübü
- Fenerbahçe

National team
2021–	Turkey
Honours
Men's volleyball
Representing Turkey
European Golden League
Gold medal – first place	2021 Belgium	Team

Mustafa Cengiz (born 29 May 1998) is a Turkish international volleyball player and plays as middle blocker for Fenerbahçe of the AXA Sigorta Efeler Ligi and the CEV Champions League.

== International ==
He is member of Turkey national team and won 2021 European Golden League in Belgium.

== Honours ==
=== Club ===
- Arkas İzmir (2017–2023)
  - Turkish League: 2017–18, 2018–19
  - Turkish Cup 2022
