= Joel Banks =

English volleyball coach

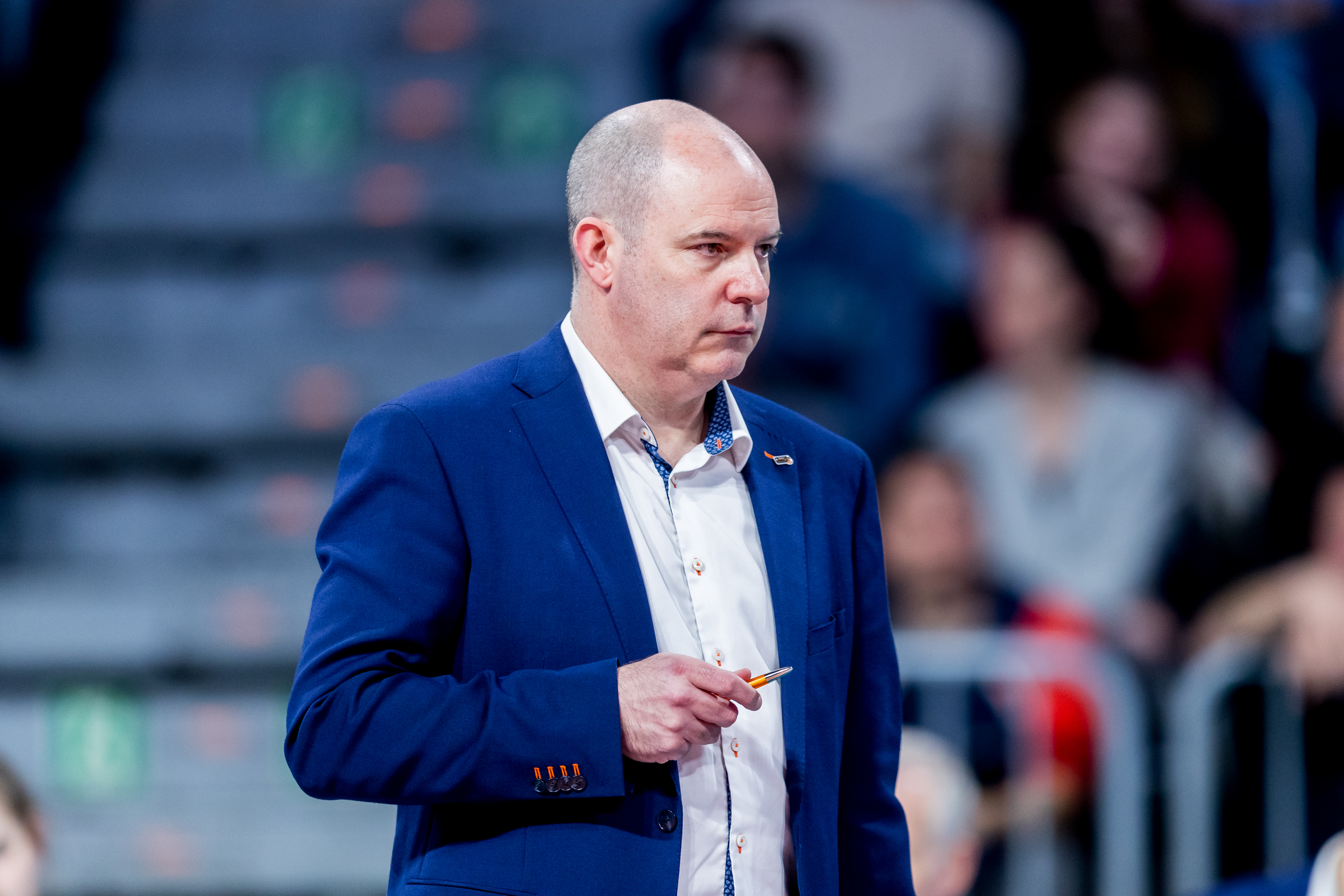

Personal information
- Nationality: British, Belgian
- Born: 3 April 1975 (age 51); Portsmouth, England

Coaching information
- Current team: Netherlands
Previous teams coached
Years	Teams
2007–2012; 2010–2012; 2012; 2013–2016; 2016–2017; 2017–2022; 2019–2023; 2022–2023; 2023–2026; 2025–	Great Britain (AC); Langhenkel Volley; Great Britain; Topsportschool Vilvoorde; Greenyard Maaseik (AC); Greenyard Maaseik; Finland; Skra Bełchatów; Berlin Recycling Volleys; Netherlands

Volleyball information
- Position: Setter

Joel Banks (born 3 April 1975) is an English professional volleyball coach and former player. He serves as head coach for the Netherlands national team.

== Honours ==
=== As a coach ===
- Domestic
  - 2011–12 Dutch SuperCup, with Langhenkel Volley
  - 2011–12 Dutch Championship, with Langhenkel Volley
  - 2017–18 Belgian Championship, with Greenyard Maaseik
  - 2018–19 Belgian Championship, with Greenyard Maaseik
  - 2023–24 German SuperCup, with Berlin Recycling Volleys
  - 2023–24 German Cup, with Berlin Recycling Volleys
  - 2023–24 German Championship, with Berlin Recycling Volleys
  - 2024–25 German SuperCup, with Berlin Recycling Volleys
  - 2024–25 German Cup, with Berlin Recycling Volleys
  - 2024–25 German Championship, with Berlin Recycling Volleys
