= Linghem, Sweden =

Linghem
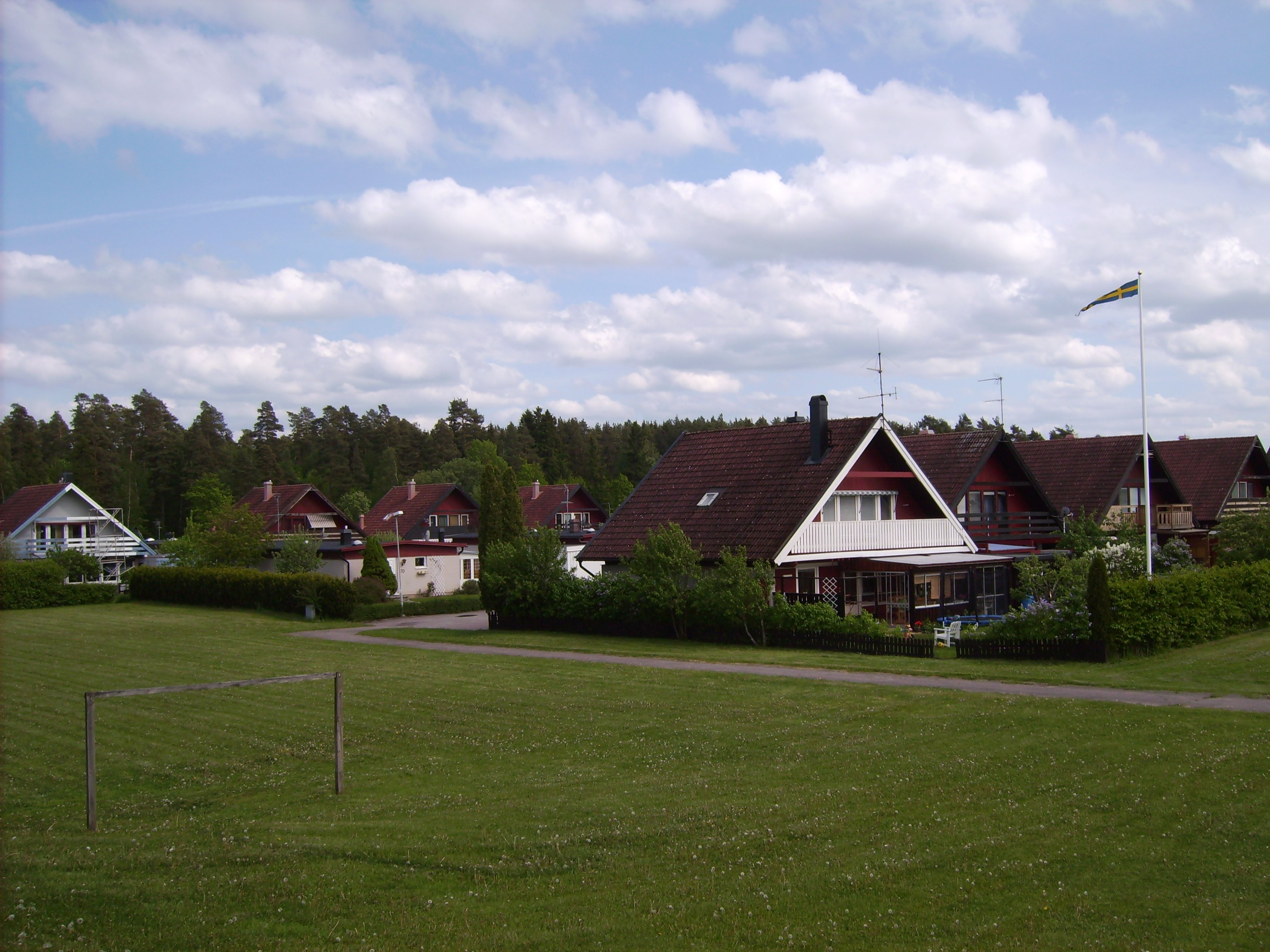

- Location within Östergötland Location within Sweden
- Coordinates: 58°26′N 15°47′E
- Country: Sweden
- Province: Östergötland
- County: Östergötland County
- Municipality: Linköping Municipality

Area
  - Total: 1.75 km^{2} (0.68 sq mi)

Population (31 December 2020)
  - Total: 2,698
  - Density: 1,540/km^{2} (3,990/sq mi)
- Time zone: UTC+1 (CET)
  - Summer (DST): UTC+2 (CEST)

Linghem is a locality situated in Linköping Municipality, Östergötland County, Sweden with 2,804 inhabitants in 2010. Linghem is located approximately 10 kilometers east of Linköping along the Southern main line. The commuter train station is north of the locality and has the Östgötapendeln going to Linköping and Norrköping every 30 minutes. A cycle path leading towards Linköping starts in the western parts of Linghem.
