= Feyzi Ahsen-Böre =

Turkish ice hockey player

Feyzi Ahsen-Böre Фәйзи Әхсән Бүре Fäyzi Äxsän Büre
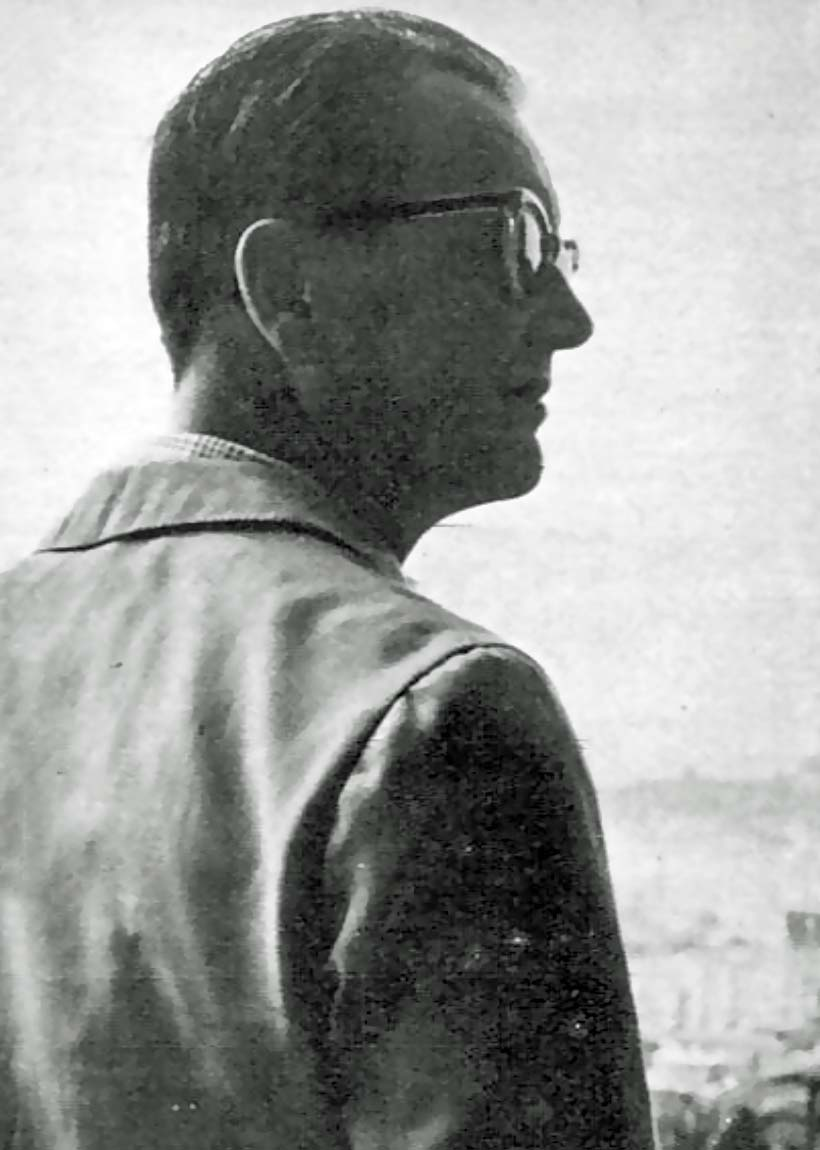
- Fayzi Ahsen-Böre in 1964.
- Born: August 25, 1925 Tsarskoye Selo, Russia
- Died: 1975 Istanbul, Turkey
- Position: Forward
- Shot: Left
- Played for: SM-sarja; Ilves
- Playing career: 1934–1945

Feyzi Ahsen-Böre (Tatar: Фәйзи Әхсән Бүре, Fäyzi Äxsän Büre; August 25, 1917 – 1975) was a Russian-born hockey player who played in Finnish team Ilves during 1934-1945, and won the championship three times. Ahsen-Böre came from a Tatar family and moved to Finland as a child but never acquired citizenship. He eventually became a citizen of Turkey. Ahsen-Böre lived in Istanbul since late 1940s. In there he operated a book store and published the first Finnish-Turkish dictionary. Father of Feyzi was the businessman Zinnetullah Ahsen Böre (né Imadutdinoff). Brothers of Feyzi (Murat, Zeyd, Vasif) all played hockey as well.

== Career statistics ==
			Regular Season					Playoffs
Season	Team	League	GP	G	A	Pts	PIM	GP	G	A	Pts	PIM
1934-35	Ilves	SM-sarja	4	0	0	0	0	--	--	--	--	--
1935-36	Ilves	SM-sarja	6	1	0	1	0	--	--	--	--	--
1936-37	Ilves	SM-sarja	5	1	0	1	0	--	--	--	--	--
1937-38	Ilves	SM-sarja	4	1	1	2	0	--	--	--	--	--
1940-41	Ilves	SM-sarja	7	0	0	0	0	--	--	--	--	--
1942-43	Ilves	SM-sarja	7	1	0	1	0	--	--	--	--	--
1943-44	Ilves	SM-sarja	4	1	0	1	0	--	--	--	--	--
1944-45	Ilves	SM-sarja	1	0	0	0	0	--	--	--	--	--
