= List of Tatars =

Tatars refer to several related Turkic ethnic group numbering 7.3 million in 21st century, including all Turkic subgroups that are still referred to as Tatars, such as Volga Tatars, Lipka Tatars, Tatars in Lithuania, Crimean Tatars, Mishar Tatars, Dobrujan Tatars, Tatar (Hazara tribe) and Siberian Tatars. Russia is home to the majority of ethnic Tatars, with a population of around 5,500,000. Uzbekistan, Kazakhstan, Ukraine, Kyrgyzstan, Tajikistan, Turkmenistan, and Azerbaijan also each have populations greater than 30,000.

Crimean Tatars, who are considered the indigenous people of Ukraine and Crimea, live in Ukraine.

== Artists ==
- Aisa Hakimcan – poet, musician, director (Finnish Tatar)
- Rustem Kildibekov – painter and monumental artist

== Architecture and design ==
- Stepan Krichinsky

== Businessmen ==
- Rinat Akhmetov – billionaire, Ukraine's richest citizen, leader of the Donetsk business group

== Dancers ==
- Galiya Izmaylova – ballerina

== Musicians ==
- Aida Garifullina – Russian lyric soprano
- Farit Yarullin – composer, author of the music to the first Tatar ballet: Şüräle
- Nacip Cihanov – composer
- Rustem Yakhin – composer
- Zulya Kamalova – Russian-born Australian singer

== Noble families ==
- Glinski
- Kochubey family
- Maksutov
- Naryshkin family

== Poets ==
- Gabdrakhim Utyz Imyani - poet

== Politicians and public figures ==
- Mintimer Shaimiev – Tatarstan's first president
- Rustam Temirgaliev – is the Director General Russia-China Investment Fund

== Sports and games persons ==
- Arminas Narbekovas
- Räshid Hakimsan
- Lotfi Nasib

== See also ==
- List of Kazan khans
- List of Astrakhan khans
- List of Crimean khans
- List of Crimean Tatars
- List of Volga Bulgaria kings
- Tatar name
- Serving Tatars
- List of Russian princely families
- Princely houses of Poland and Lithuania
