= Sharlyk =

Sharlyk (Russian: Шарлык) is the name of several rural localities (villages and selos) in Russia:

- Sharlyk, Republic of Bashkortostan, a village in Yanyshevsky Selsoviet of Blagovarsky District of the Republic of Bashkortostan
- Sharlyk, Orenburg Oblast, a selo in Sharlyksky Selsoviet of Sharlyksky District of Orenburg Oblast
