= Mishar Tatar =

Mishar Tatar may refer to:

- Mishar Tatar dialect
- Mishar Tatars
