= Husain Faizkhanov =

Tatar historian and philologist (1823–1866)

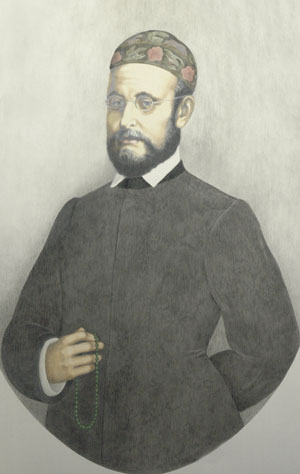
Husain Faizkhanov.

Husain Faizkhanovich Faizkhanov (Russian: Хусаин Фаизханович Фаизханов, Tatar: Хөсәен Фәезхан улы Фәезханов, Xösəyen Fəyezxan ulı Fəyezxanov; 1823, Simbirsk Governorate – 29 August 1866) was a Tatar historian, philologist and teacher. For the Russians, Faizkhanov was an important orientalist and for Tatar nation the first professional historian and significant reformer of Islamic teaching. Faizkhanov was part of the Mishar Tatar ethnos.

Faizkhanov lectured from 1854 at the Faculty of Oriental Languages of St. Petersburg University. Faizkhanov played a significant role in the studies of the epigraphy of the Kasimov Khanate. In 1860, Faizkhanov made exact copies of Kasimov's Tatar tombstones. He also found the tombstone of Uraz-Muhammad Khan, who was killed in 1610 by False Dmitry II. The materials acquired by Faizhanov were used by the famous orientalist V.V. Velyaminov-Zernov in his main work "Research of Kasimov kings and princes" (Исследование о касимовских царях и царевичах). Faizkhanov wrote a work in 1862 named Islah al-Madaris (“School Reform”), according to which Tatar education was in need of "European methods of education". The text was not published, but it is said to be the first samples of the reform movement later known as Jadidism.

Faizkhanov made pilgrimage to Mecca twice.
