= Räshid Hakimsan =

Finnish ice hockey player and coach (1934–1997)

- Рәшит Хәкимҗан; Reşid Hakimcan رشيد حكيم جان
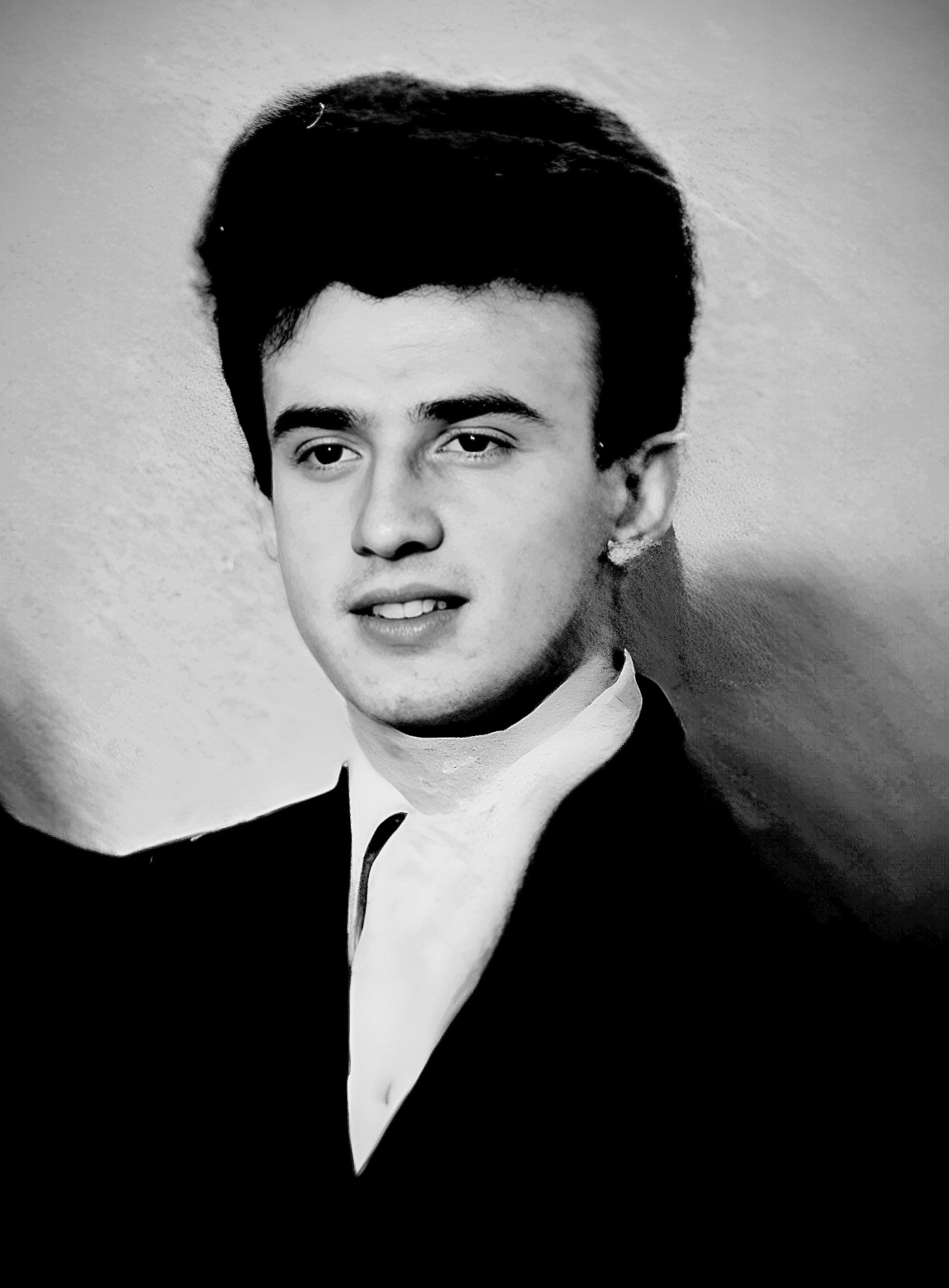
- Hakimsan in 1952
- Born: 5 April 1934; Tampere, Finland
- Died: 4 September 1997 (aged 63)
- Other name: Räshid Hakimdshan
- Father: Aisa Hakimcan

Räshid Hakimsan (Note: Also 'Hakimdshan' and in Turkish, Reşid Hakimcan.) (Tatar: Рәшит Хәкимҗан, romanized: Rəşit Xəkimcan, Tatar pronunciation: [ɾæˈʃit χækimˈʑɑn] (Note: In Mishar Tatar dialect, letter c is [d͡ʒ] and /χæ/ is /хa/.); 5 April 1934 – 4 September 1997) was a Finnish ice hockey player and referee who played in SM-Sarja during 1951–1960 and won the Finnish Championship four times. Sports writer Martti Huhtamäki called Hakimsan one of the "big favorites" of local hockey crowds of his time. After his playing career and until 1974, Hakimsan operated as a hockey referee of international status. He was also among the most active referees of his time in Finland and was awarded afterwards.

In addition to hockey, Hakimsan won silver at Finnish junior championship Swedish relay in 1951, and in 1952 as a footballer he won the Football Association of Finland junior championship and was awarded as the best in the team.

His father, Aisa Hakimcan (Aisja Hakimsanoff), was a Tatar artist born in Nizhny Novgorod Oblast.

== Career ==
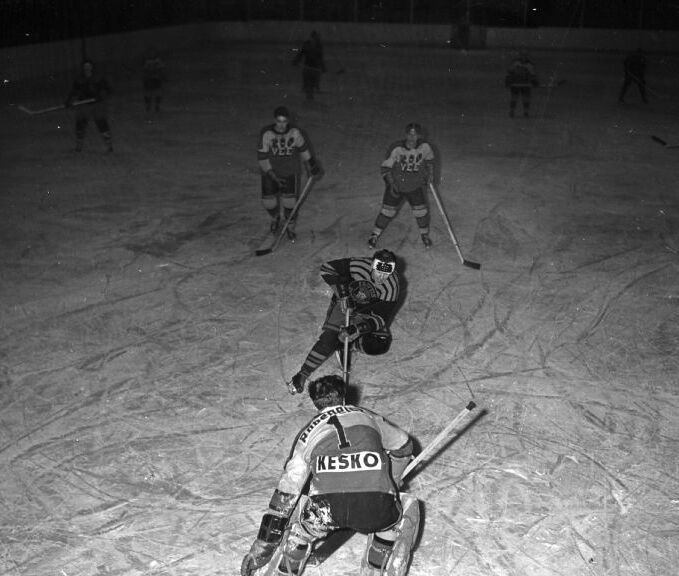
Hakimsan in 1960

=== Hockey ===
==== Player ====
Räshid Hakimsan represented his entire career the local team Ilves. During 1951–1960, he played 88 matches as an attacker, and his points were 64 + 35 = 99, and penalties 33 minutes. Hakimsan made five hat tricks. He won the Finnish Championship in 1952, 1957, 1958 and 1960. He also won the junior Finnish Championship in 1952 and 1953, as well as the Finnish Cup in 1958.

Hakimsan represented Finland in eight matches of junior national ice hockey and two B-series national ice hockey matches. In 1952, playing against Norway, Hakimsan was awarded as the best attacker in the team and a local newspaper wrote about him as a "crowd favorite" who "duped the Norwegians with ease".

Hakimsan made the opening goal of the first Finnish synthetic ice rink Koulukatu in 1956.

In 1959, when Ilves traveled to Italy and Germany to play a summer tournament, Hakimsan was among the team. They first played in a Cortina d'Ampezzo olympic stadium and after that in Germany's Oberstdorf against Krefeld and lastly in Berlin against the East Germany national team.

In 1960, when Hakimsan played his last match, winning gold, he, Finnish hockey players Raimo Kilpiö and Jorma Salmi were called "the most dangerous trio in the league".

==== Referee ====
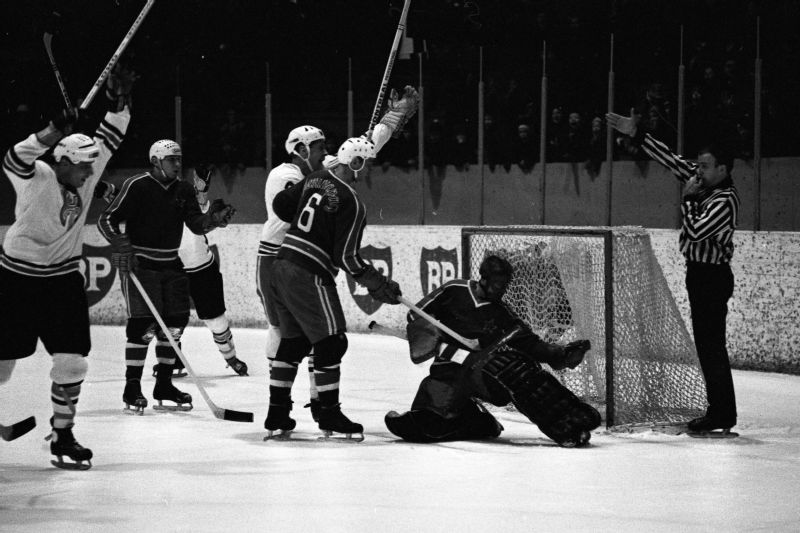
Local Tampere team vs. SKA Leningrad (1966). Hakimsan is on the right.

During 1962–1974, Hakimsan acted as a referee in 181 SM-matches and two national ice hockey matches, as well as many other international matches such as Ahearne Cup (1970), FISU World University Games (1970) and Finnish national team vs. Torpedo Nizhny Novgorod (then-Torpedo Gorki, 1967).

After his career as a referee ended, Hakimsan was positioned as 5th out of 31 referees in Finnish hockey league.

The Finnish Ice Hockey Association awarded him in 1979.

=== Football ===
During his younger years, Hakimsan was also known as a talented football player. He played football in TaPa and won the 1952 Football Association of Finland junior championship and was awarded as the best in the team. A 1953 newspaper article named "Viisas Räsid" (Wise Räshid) describes how it is a shame that Hakimsan has to choose between football and ice hockey since he's a player with "rare intellectual playing style" and "we don't get his kind often".

Hakimsan did not however quit football entirely. In 1956 he won the junior district championship. His team awarded him with a silver medal.

Both as a hockey player and a footballer Hakimsan was often praised for his skills, but he was also described as a selfish player, because too often he tried to make all the goals himself.

=== Other ===
In 1951, representing team Tampereen Pyrintö, Hakimsan won silver at the Swedish relay Finnish junior championship. Timing of his team was 2:04.0h.

== Achievements ==
=== Ice hockey ===
- 4 Finnish Championships (1952, 1957, 1958, 1960)
- 2 Junior Finnish Championships (1952, 1953)
- 1 Finnish Cup Championship (1958)
- Finnish junior national team best attacker (1952)
- 2 medals as a referee (1979)

=== Football ===
- Football Association of Finland junior championship and medal as best player (1952)
- Junior district championship (1956)
- Silver medal, TaPa (year unknown)

=== Other ===
- Finnish junior championship Swedish relay, Silver medal (1951)

== Personal life ==
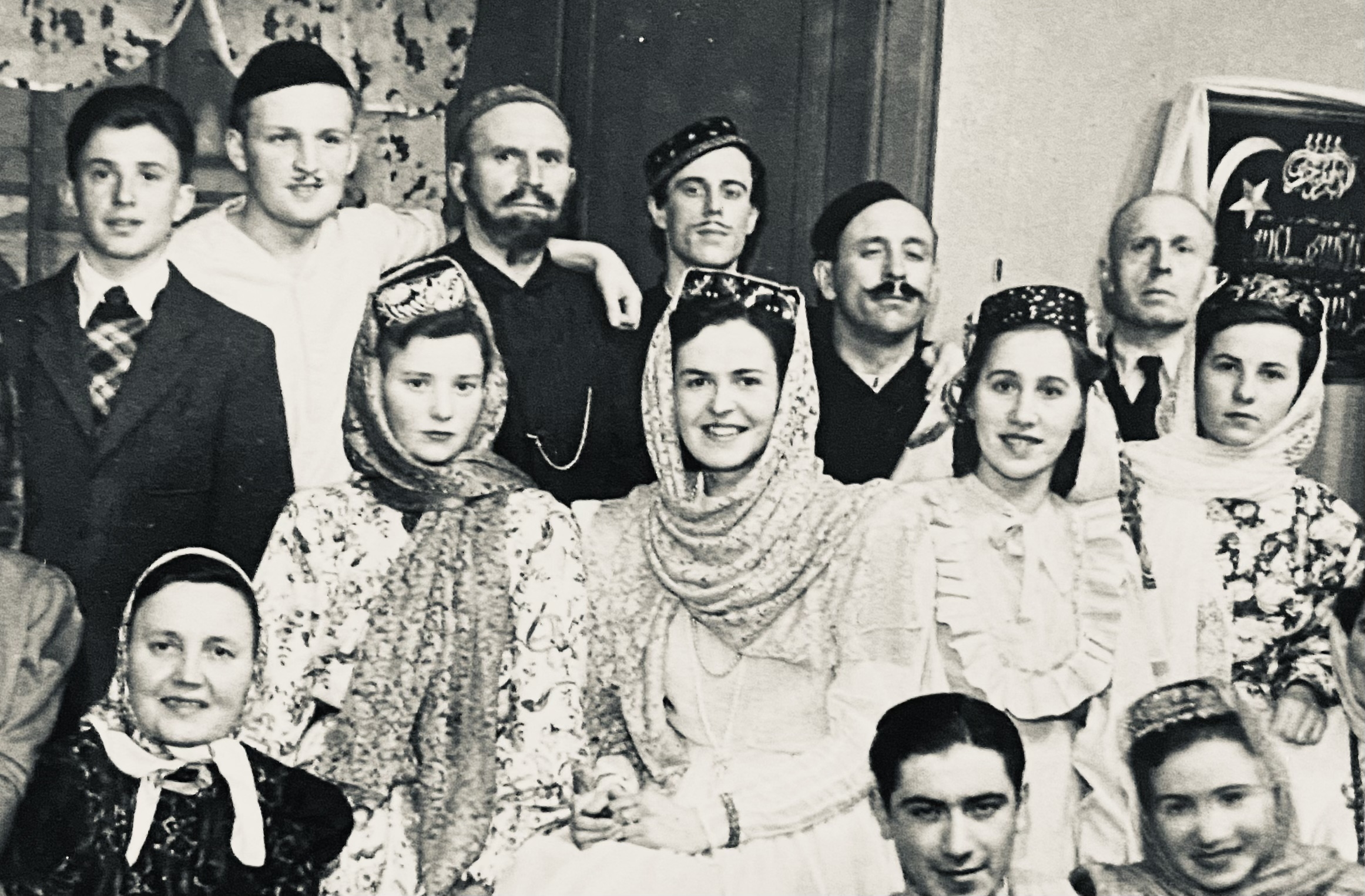
Reşid (left) in a play Asıl yar, directed by his father (right corner backrow) in 1949. Sister Aliye in the middle.

Hakimsan (Hakimdshan) died in 1997 of a sudden heart attack while cycling at the age of 63. For his day job, he worked as a drafting technician at Tampella.

Hakimsan was a part of the Finnish Tatar community. Among the community of Tampere, his father was the known artist, Aisja Hakimsanoff. (Aisa Hakimcan).

Finnish Tatar hockey players Mönever Saadetdin and Lotfi Nasibullen played briefly in the same team as Hakimsan in 1950s.

=== Name ===
In Standard Tatar: Рәшит Хәкимҗан, Räşit Xäkimcan / Rəşit Xəkimcan, /ɾæˈʃit χækimˈʑɑn/, Mishar Dialect: /d͡ʒan/; in Finnish Tatar sources the name is spelled in Turkish (Reşid Hakimcan) and also in İske imlä (رشيد حكيم جان).

Original Russian version of the surname is Hakimsanoff (Хакимжанов, Khakimzhanov).

Finnish nickname: "Räskä".

== Literature ==
- Baibulat, Muazzez: Tampereen Islamilainen Seurakunta: juuret ja historia. Gummerus Kirjapaino Oy, 2004. ISBN 952-91-6753-9
- Bedretdin, Kadriye (editor): Tugan Tel - Kirjoituksia Suomen tataareista. Suomen Itämainen Seura, 2011. ISBN 978-951-9380-78-0
- Suikki, Reijo (päätoimittaja): Jääkiekkokirja 2005 - 2006. Egmont Kustannus Oy Ab, 2005. ISBN 952-469-357-7.
- Forss, Risto, ym.: Suuri Jääkiekkoteos 1. Scandia-Kirjat Oy, 1979. ISBN 951-9466-14-2.
- Leinonen, Kimmo: Koulukadun Sankarit, Tampereen jääkiekkoilun historia 1928-1965. APALI, 2014. ISBN 978-952-5877-38-0.
- Leitzinger, Antero: Mishäärit - Suomen vanha islamilainen yhteisö. Kirja-Leitzinger, 1996. ISBN 952-9752-08-3
- Raevuori, Antero & Honkavaara, Aarne: Pelimiehiä, tulisieluja - Tampereen Ilves 50 vuotta. Ilves ry, 1981. ISBN 951-99 323-7-2.
