= Sharlyk, Orenburg Oblast =

Rural locality in Orenburg Oblast, Russia

Coordinates: 52°55′23″N 54°44′34″E

Sharlyk (Russian: Шарлык) is a rural locality (a selo) and the administrative center of Sharlyksky District, Orenburg Oblast, Russia. Population: 7,575 (2010 census); 8,117 (2002 census); 8,219 (1989 Soviet census).
