= Sharlyk, Republic of Bashkortostan =

Sharlyk Шарлык
- Village
- Location within Bashkortostan Location within Russia
- Coordinates: 54°54′N 55°08′E
- Country: Russia
- Region: Bashkortostan
- District: Blagovarsky District
- Time zone: UTC+5:00

Sharlyk (Russian: Шарлык; Bashkir: Шырлыҡ, Şırlıq) is a rural locality (a village) and the administrative centre of Yanyshevsky Selsoviet, Blagovarsky District, Bashkortostan, Russia. The population was 506 as of 2010. There are 7 streets.

== Geography ==
Sharlyk is located 32 km north of Yazykovo (the district's administrative centre) by road. Neyfeld is the nearest rural locality.
