= Sharlyksky District =

Sharlyksky District Шарлыкский район (Russian)
- District
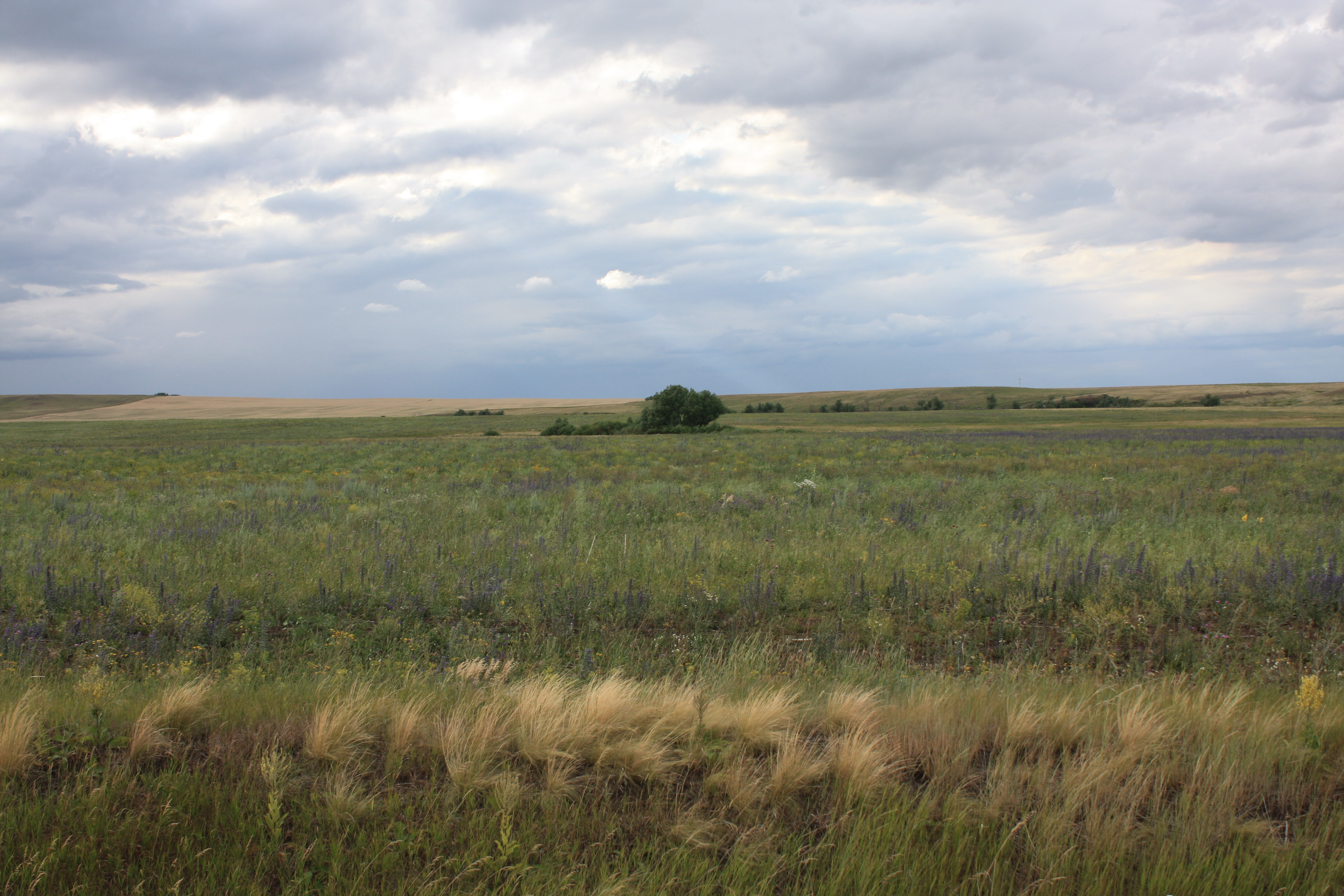
- Steppe landscape in Sharlyksky District

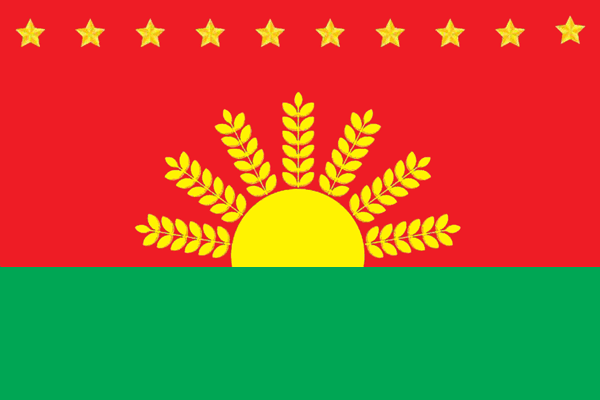
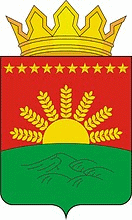
- Flag Coat of arms
- Location of Sharlyksky District in Orenburg Oblast
- Coordinates: 52°55′32″N 54°45′13″E
- Country: Russia
- Federal subject: Orenburg Oblast
- Established: 1927
- Administrative center: Sharlyk

Area
  - Total: 2,900 km^{2} (1,100 sq mi)

Population (2010 Census)
  - Total: 18,032
  - Density: 6.2/km^{2} (16/sq mi)
  - Urban: 0%
  - Rural: 100%

Administrative structure
  - Administrative divisions: 17 selsoviet
  - Inhabited localities: 49 rural localities

Municipal structure
  - Municipally incorporated as: Sharlyksky Municipal District
  - Municipal divisions: 0 urban settlements, 17 rural settlements
- Time zone: UTC+5 (MSK+2)
- OKTMO ID: 53656000
- Website: http://mo-sl.orb.ru/

Sharlyksky District (Russian: Шарлыкский райо́н) is an administrative and municipal district (raion), one of the thirty-five in Orenburg Oblast, Russia. It is located in the northwest of the oblast. The area of the district is 2,900 square kilometers (1,100 sq mi). Its administrative center is the rural locality (a selo) of Sharlyk. Population: 18,032 (2010 Census); 22,128 (2002 census); 23,797 (1989 Soviet census). The population of Sharlyk accounts for 42.0% of the total district's population.

== Famous natives ==
- Sagit Agish was a Bashkir poet, writer and playwright.
