= Mishar Tatar dialect =

Kipchak dialects spoken by Mishar Tatars

Mishar Tatar
- Mishar; Western Tatar
- Мишәр Татар, Mişär Tatar, Mişər Tatar көнбатыш татар, könbatış tatar
- Pronunciation: [miʃær tatar]
- Native to: Russia, Finland
- Region: Mordovia, Penza, Ulyanovsk, Tatarstan, Orenburg, Nizhny Novgorod, Chuvashia, Bashkortostan, Samara, Volgograd, Saratov
- Ethnicity: Mishar Tatars
- Language family: Turkic: Common Turkic; Kipchak; Kipchak–Bulgar or Kipchak-Cuman; Tatar; Mishar Tatar
- Early form: Cuman
- Writing system: Cyrillic, Latin

Language codes
- ISO 639-3: –
- Glottolog: west2405

Mishar Tatar (Мишәр, Mişär / Mişər, Мишәр Татар, Mişär Tatar / Mişər Tatar, көнбатыш татар, könbatış tatar) is a dialect of Tatar spoken by Mishar Tatars, a subgroup of Volga Tatars, mainly in Penza, Ulyanovsk, Orenburg, Nizhny Novgorod, Samara, Volgograd, and Saratov oblasts of Russia, in Tatarstan, Bashkortostan, Chuvashia and Mordovia, and also in Finland and Estonia.

Some linguists (Radlov, Samoylovich) think that Mishar belongs to the Kipchak-Cuman group of languages rather than to the Kipchak-Bulgar group. Especially the regional dialect of Sergachsky District (Nizhny Novgorod) is said to be faithfully close to the ancient Kipchak language. Increased contacts with Kazan Tatars have lessened these differences.

Mishar is the dialect spoken by the Tatar minority of Finland. The origins of the Tatar community living in Finland rest upon the merchants coming from the villages of Nizhny Novgorod Oblast (then-Governorate).

== Comparison to Kazan Tatar ==
Finnish Mishar Tatar artist Aisa Hakimcan, born in Sergachsky district in 1896, speaking in 1952. (four samples).

Mishar Tatar dialect is not a "corrupted version of Tatar, as thought by some, but rather an independently developed dialect with unique phonological and morphological features, influenced by ancient Kipchak tribes, Oghuz, and Finno-Ugric elements".

Compared to Standard Tatar (Kazan), Mishar speakers use velar g and k instead of the uvular ğ and q, both c and ç are affricates ([ʑ] and [ɕ] in Kazan Tatar dialect) and [a] stays unrounded. In some words where there is letter c (җ), Mishars pronounce it as y [j] (cäy –> yäy, "summer"). Sometimes [v] replaces [j] in Mishar, like söyü –> sevü, "to love"). Noticeable vocabulary differences also exist, like "sunflower", which is könbağış in Kazan, but aybagar in the Mishar dialect. "Dog" is et in Kazan and kıçık / koçok in Mishar.

Ancient features, absent from the Kazan dialect, are present in Mishar Tatar, like ul kilä ("he/she/it comes"), ul kiläder. Other affix differences can include kilgälä, kilgäklä, "come occasionally"; barasım kilä, barma kelim / bargım keli, "i want to go". Monophthongization of diphthongs exists also (köy, kü, "melody"; qoyrıq, kurik, "tail").

Based on written Mishar Tatar used by the Finnish Tatars, the first front vowel of a word may appear as a back vowel. This results in forms such as mohtäräm instead of Möxtäräm (“respected”), hazer instead of xäzer (“now”), and rahmät instead of räxmät (“thank you”). The same pattern also occurs in personal names, for example Mohammäd–Möxämmät and Halimä–Xälimä.

== Sub dialects ==
Mishar Tatar dialects (сөйләшлер) are according to Makhmutova two (Ch and Ts) or according to Gabdulkhay Akhatov three (Ch, Ts and mixed) groups.

In the Western (Mişär) dialect Ç is pronounced [tʃ] (southern or Lambir Mişärs) and as [ts] (northern Mişärs or Nizhgars). C is pronounced [dʒ]. There are no differences between v and w, q and k, g and ğ in the Mişär dialect. The Cyrillic alphabet doesn't have special letters for q, ğ and w, so Mişär speakers have no difficulty reading Tatar written in Cyrillic.

Classification of Mishar Tatar dialects:

- Ch-dialects or Southern Mishar: пытчак, pıtçak < Kazan пычак, pıçak (knife)
  - Temnikovsky dialect — western rayons (esp. Temnikovsky) of Mordovia, south-eastern part of Penza oblast.
  - Lyambirsky dialect — eastern part (esp. Lyambirsky) of Mordovia.
  - Bashkortostan dialect — Birsk, Karaidelsky, Mishkinsky rayons of Bashkortostan.
  - Sharlyk dialect — Sharlyk of Orenburg oblast.
  - Orenburg dialect — Orenburg oblast.
  - Dialects of Volgograd and Saratov oblasts.
  - Kuznetsk dialect — Kuznetsk of Penza oblast. A mixed dialect by Akhatov.
  - Khvalynsk dialect — south Ulyanovsk oblast (Khvalynsk). A mixed dialect by Akhatov.
- Ts-dialects or Northern Mishar: пыцак, pıtsak < Kazan пычак, pıçak (knife)
  - Sergachsky dialect — Sergachsky of Nizhny Novgorod oblast.
  - Drozhzhanovsky dialect — Drozhzhanovsky rayon of Tatarstan and Chuvashia
  - Chistopolsky dialect (mixed) — Chistopolsky of Tatarstan and Samara oblast.
  - Melekessky dialect (contingently) — northern rayons (esp. Melekessky) of Ulyanovsk oblast.
