= Rustem Kildibekov =

Soviet and Russian Tatar artist

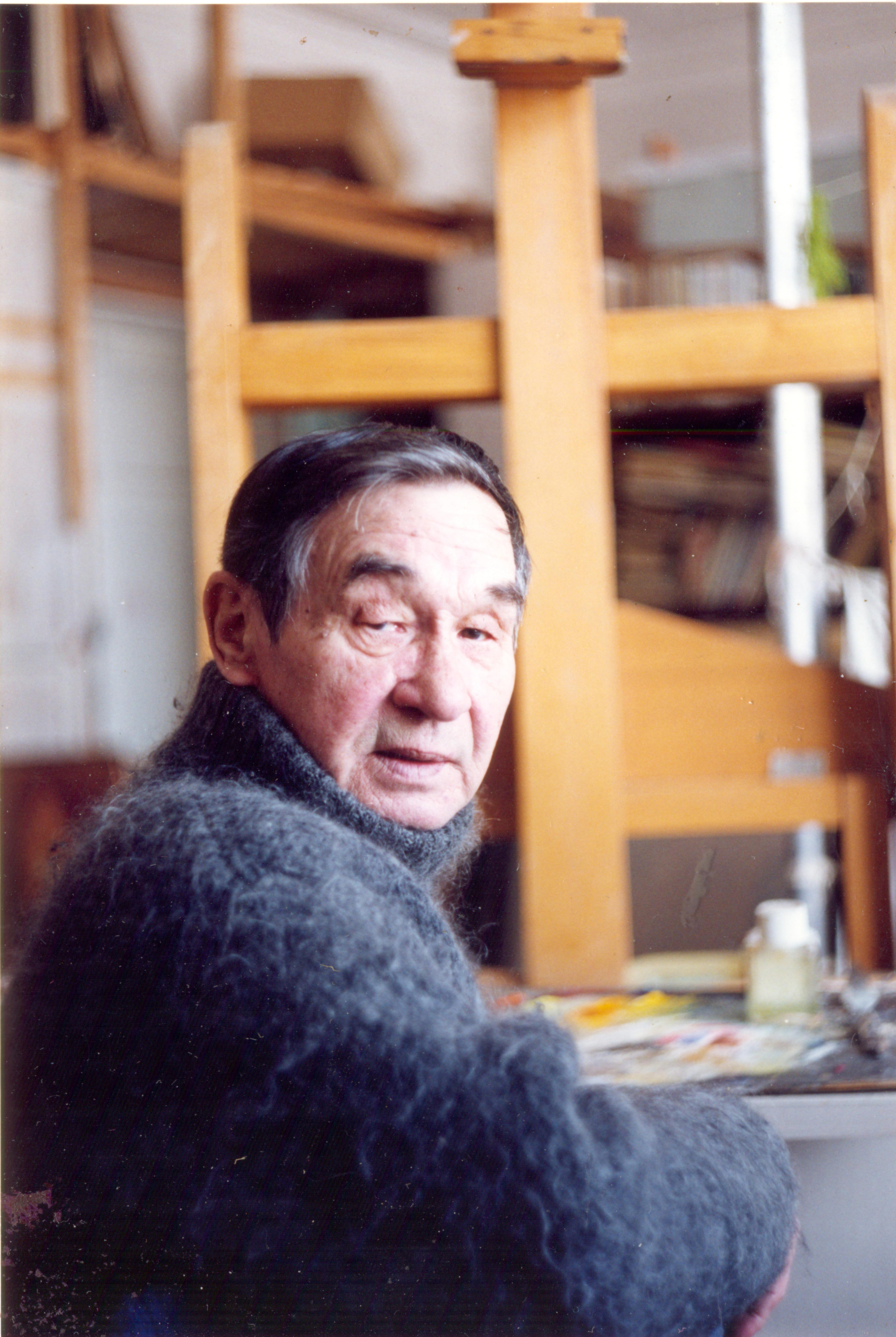
- Rustem Kildibekov, 2018
- Born: 30 March 1934; Kazan, Tatar ASSR, RSFSR, Soviet Union
- Died: 9 November 2023 (aged 89); Kazan, Republic of Tatarstan, Russia
- Education: Kazan Art School; Lviv National Academy of Arts (formerly Lviv State Institute of Applied and Decorative Arts)
- Known for: Painting, monumental art, graphic art, poster art, stained glass, mosaic, tapestry
- Spouse: Maria Semyonovna Kildibekova
- Awards: Gabdulla Tukay State Prize of the Republic of Tatarstan (2011); Honored Artist of the Russian Federation (2011); People's Artist of the Republic of Tatarstan (2006); Honored Art Worker of the Tatar ASSR (1991)

Rustem Akhmedovich Kildibekov (Tatar: Рөстәм Әхмәт улы Килдебәков; 30 March 1934, Kazan, Tatar ASSR, RSFSR, Soviet Union – 9 November 2023, Kazan, Republic of Tatarstan, Russia) was a Soviet and Russian Tatar artist, painter, and monumentalist. He was an Honored Artist of the Russian Federation (2011) and People's Artist of the Republic of Tatarstan (2006), and had also been named an Honored Art Worker of the Tatar ASSR (1991). He was a laureate of the Gabdulla Tukay State Prize of the Republic of Tatarstan (2011).

He got interested in art as a child. In 1954, he graduated from the Kazan Art School, and then he moved to the Ukrainian Soviet Socialist Republic. He studied at the Lviv National Academy of Arts, graduating in 1960 with a diploma project consisting of interior murals for the Lviv Museum of Ethnography and Crafts. That same year he returned to Kazan with his wife, Maria, and their daughter, having started a family while still a student. He immediately began working actively as an artist, taught at an art studio attached to a palace of culture, and worked for the Tatar Art Fund. In 1987, he was accepted into the Artist's Union of the USSR, and for several years served on the board of the Union of Artists of Tatarstan. He is known as a versatile artist who achieved success in many forms and genres, including monumental art, easel painting, graphic art, poster art, sgraffito, mosaic, and tapestry. Alone and as part of author collectives, he decorated a number of public buildings in Kazan — the sgraffito on the façade of the Hotel Volga (1961–1963), a relief mosaic panel in the interior of the Kazan restaurant (1963), the sgraffito Chemistry on the façade of a building of the Kazan National Research Technological University (1966), the panel Kazan — Capital of Soviet Tataria on the wall of the Kazan suburban railway station (1967), leather panels in the banquet halls of the Hotel Tatarstan and the House of Tatar Cuisine (1967), murals in the interior of the Detsky Mir store (1970), and mosaics at the Builders' Palace of Culture (1972). He also worked in Naberezhnye Chelny, Zelenodolsk, and Menzelinsk.

The decorative tendencies of Kildibekov's monumental work found their expression in his paintings and thematic pictures, which are distinguished by their colors, deep symbolism, national imagery, and engagement with Tatar folk art. Representative works of this kind include the canvases Lacemakers (1962–1964), Conversation. Old Man with a Fish (1964), Arsk Still Life (1974), Arsk Craftswomen (1974), and Kukmor Felt Boots (1978). Kildibekov also distinguished in the genres of still life and landscape, as well as in graphic art — critics particularly single out his series on the themes of Tatar folk tales (1967). He was also active in poster art, with his works Let's Dress Kazan in Bright Green (1962) and How Well Your May Day Attire Suits You, Tataria! (1968) considered clear achievements of that period. In the late 1970s and early 1980s Kildibekov's art reached its highest flowering, marked by his turn to philosophy, spiritual tradition, difficult pages of Tatar history, and the image of Gabdulla Tukay. One of the artist's finest works is the painting Together (2013), in which Kildibekov portrayed himself with his wife, who for many years had been his co-author in creating tapestries that echo his paintings both thematically and stylistically.

He died in 2023 at the age of 89.

== Biography ==
Rustem Kildibekov was born on 30 March 1934 in Kazan. Tatar by nationality, he came from the ancient Kildibekov family, which traced its lineage back to the era of the Golden Horde. His father, Akhmed (b. 1900), was the son of a mullah and worked as an engineer; his mother, Shamsinur (b. 1913, née Akhatova), was originally from Chita and worked as a librarian. He had two younger sisters, Nailya and Nuriya. His niece Alfiya Ilyasova is also an artist.

He began drawing as a child, after seeing a neighbor in his communal apartment use a stencil to paint cornflowers on a wall during renovations. From 1945 to 1947, he attended Children's Art School No. 1. After completing the seventh grade of secondary school, in 1949 he enrolled at the Kazan Art School, where he studied under Semyon Aronovich Rotnitsky. In 1954, after graduating from the school, he moved to the Ukrainian Soviet Socialist Republic, enrolling at the Lviv State Academy of Arts. It was in Lviv, during his second year of study, that he met the applied artist Maria Karadzheva, whom he soon married; their daughter Diana was born shortly afterward. He graduated from the institute in 1960, completing as his diploma project the tempera murals Potters and Coopers at the Lviv Museum of Ethnography and Crafts under the supervision of Roman Yulianovich Selsky. That same year he returned to Kazan with his family.

In 1961, he took a position at the Tatar branch of the Art Fund of the RSFSR, and from 1965 to 1985 he was a member of its art council. From 1962 he was affiliated with Agitplakat (the agitation-poster studio), and from 1962 to 1969, he taught at the art studio of the Lenin Palace of Culture in Kazan; one of his students there was the tapestry artist Anatoly Nikolaevich Yegorov. In 1987 he was admitted as a member of the Artist's Union of the USSR, after repeated attempts and resistance from ideological authorities. From 1988 to 1995, he served on the board of the Union of Artists of Tatarstan. In 1991, he became an Honored Art Worker of the Tatar SSR. In 2006, he was awarded the title of People's Artist of the Republic of Tatarstan, and in 2011, that of Honored Artist of the Russian Federation. He was nominated for the Gabdulla Tukay State Prize of the Republic of Tatarstan in 2009 and 2011, which he finally received on his second nomination, jointly with his wife, for a series of works of monumental and applied art. In 2015, he marked his 80th birthday. In 2017, he was widowed after more than 60 years of marriage.

Kildibekov was a versatile artist. Critics and the public particularly recognized his work in monumental art — leather and smalt mosaics, murals, and sgraffito — which adorned public buildings in Kazan, Naberezhnye Chelny, Zelenodolsk, and Menzelinsk. He also practiced actively the decorative and applied art, easel painting, graphic art, poster art, and tapestry. Working within a vein of nonconformism, deliberate primitivism, simplified forms, and flatness, Kildibekov nonetheless achieved considerable success. As art historian Svetlana Chervonnaya noted, the artist's varied works reflect numerous discoveries and achievements in painting, monumental art, and tapestry, and in its versatility places him alongside such a classic figure of Tatar art as Baki Urmanche.

Throughout his life in art, Kildibekov sought and followed his own path, demonstrating inner independence, his own sense of time and life, self-reliance of creative thought, and firmness in defending his own point of view. Since 1960, he participated in republic-level, zonal, and All-Russian exhibitions. Solo exhibitions were held in Kazan in 1994, 2014, 2019, and 2023. Kildibekov's works are held in the collections of the State Museum of Fine Arts of the Republic of Tatarstan and the National Museum of the Republic of Tatarstan, the Bolgar Historical and Architectural Museum-Reserve, the Zelenodolsk Museum of Historical and Cultural Heritage, the Radishchev Art Museum, the Savitsky Museum of Art in Nukus, and private collections in Russia and abroad.

Rustem Kildibekov died on 9 November 2023 in Kazan at the age of 89. Tatarstan's leadership expressed condolences, including Rustam Minnikhanov and Mintimer Shaimiev. A farewell ceremony was held on 11 November at the Gallery of Contemporary Art, and Kildibekov was buried beside his wife at the cemetery of the village of Salmachi.

== Artistic legacy ==
=== Monumental art, sgraffito, mosaics, and murals ===
The intensive civic construction of the 1960s in Kazan and Tatarstan — the building of major public and residential structures, palaces of culture, factories, and schools — encouraged the broad involvement of artists in the improvement of the city, and Kildibekov was no exception. This period was important for monumental painting in the republic, which had been absent for the previous thirty years, and as a result most works were created under conditions of limited resources and means. The circle of monumentalist artists consisted of young masters: besides Kildibekov, it included Sergei Mikhailovich Bubennov, Vasil Malikovich Malikov, and Viktor Kronidovich Fyodorov. Their works were the product of collective creativity from the sketch stage through to execution of the author's design, and the artists themselves often had to carry out their own ideas simply to earn a living. From his earliest works, Kildibekov proved himself a worthy co-author alongside his more senior colleagues. His works demonstrated an organic connection between composition and the character of the object, an understanding of the significance of the monumental in art, and command of various techniques. Far more than wall painting, it was the creation of mosaics for building decor — both in Kazan and in a number of cities of the republic — that attracted Kildibekov, along with other artists, from the early 1970s onward. Murals and mosaics of the period developed such themes as revolution and the struggle for peace, youth and sport, historical subjects, events from the life of the country, holidays and everyday life, motifs from folk tales, and themes of national imagery.

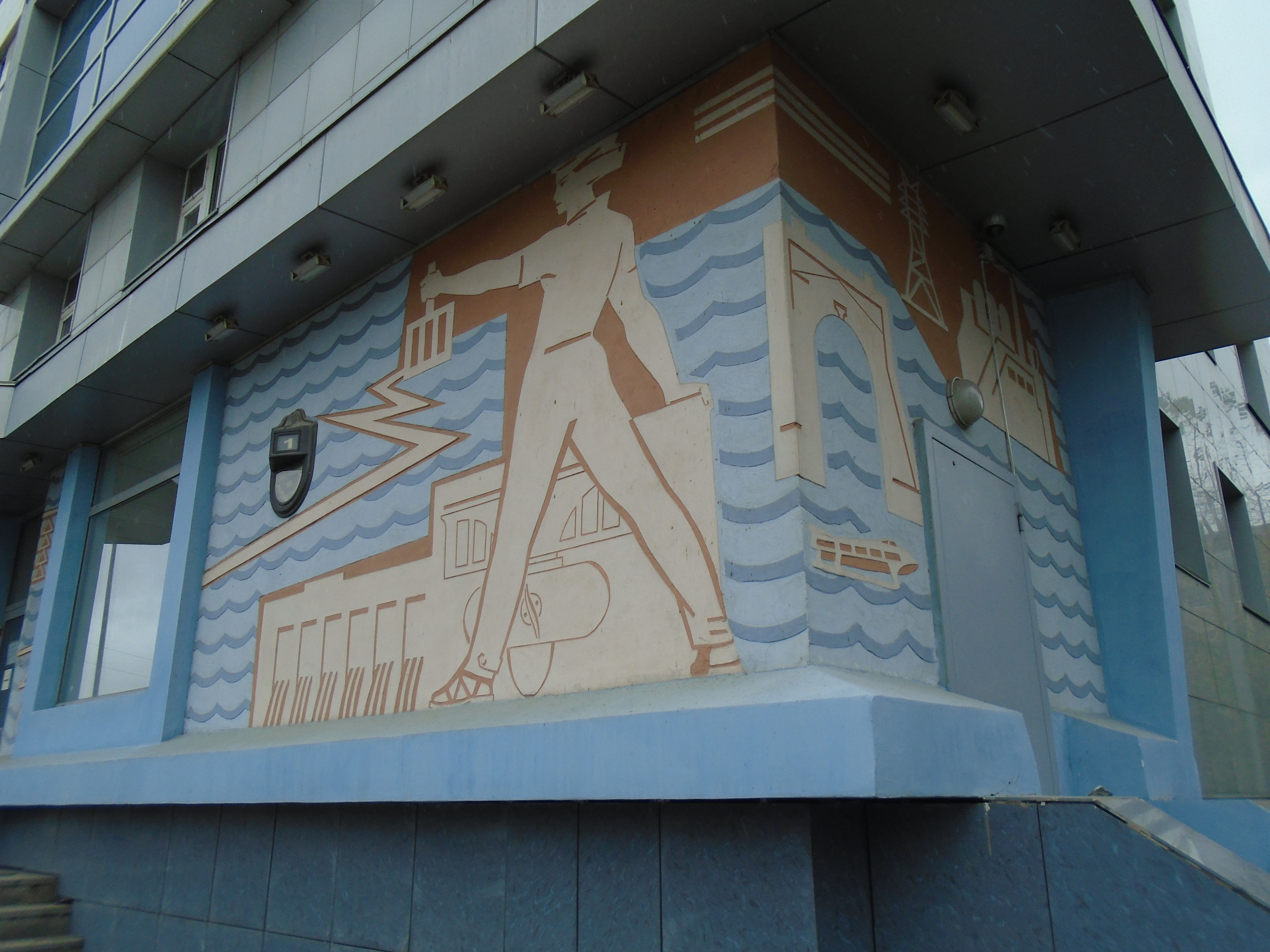
Hotel Volga, Said-Galiev Street

In 1961–1963, Kildibekov with Bubennov and Malikov, decorated the façade of the new Hotel Volga with a monumental-decorative sgraffito composition on the theme Kazan — Port of Five Seas and People of the Volga Region. Drawing on symbolic images of electric power, oil, water, and fish, the authors created a narrative about the life of the peoples of the Volga region and how the river united north and south, sharing its riches with them. The composition is executed in a muted three-color palette, with a dark background combined with reddish and gray tones for the depicted objects. According to critics, the solution was not without flaws — it featured excessive schematic representations of certain concepts, and the sgraffito character was crude — but it marked the beginning of a revival of this art form in Kazan. In 1963, Kildibekov, together with Bubennov and Malikov, created relief-mosaic panels titled Old Kazan and New Kazan in the interior of the Kazan restaurant at the hotel of the same name on Bauman Street, whose interiors had been reconstructed and decorated to a design by Alexei Andreevich Sporius and Nikolai Stepanovich Artamonov.

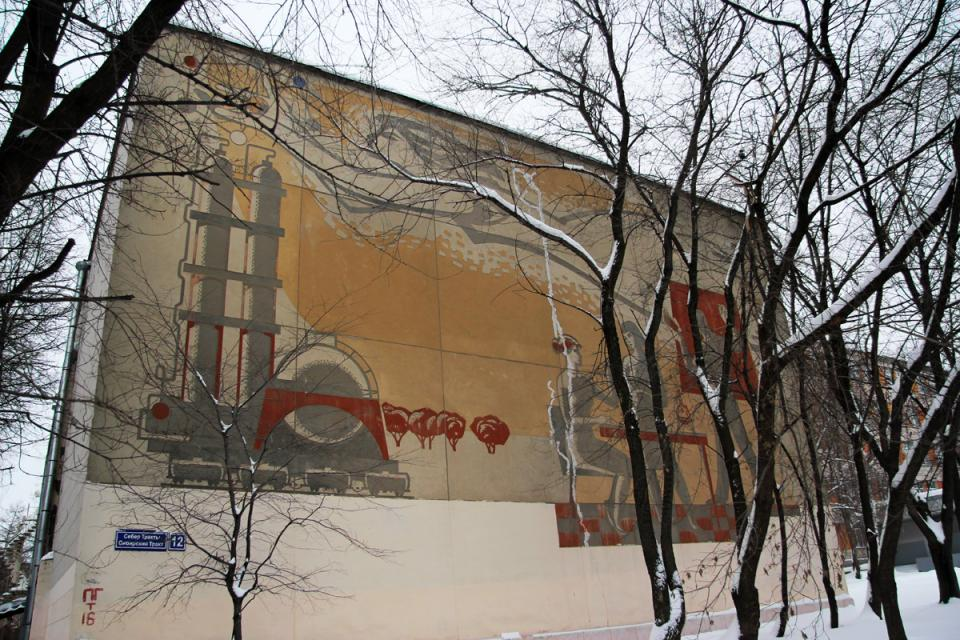
Panel Chemistry, Siberian Trakt

In 1965, Kildibekov and Malikov, working as a pair, created a memorial stele to Musa Cälil, erected on Vosstaniya Square in the Leninsky District of the city. The composition combines the technique of sgraffito with deep relief; color is almost absent, and there are no stock imagery elements, with the main emphasis placed on the portrait expressiveness of the poet's stern, clear, sorrowful face — an imagery solution that appropriately conveys the theme of Cälil's heroism and creative work. In 1966 the same artists created the sgraffito Chemistry on the façade of a newly built five-story building of the Kazan Chemical-Technological Institute. The panel covers the entire blank end wall of the assembly hall, creating a large-scale urban planning accent. The work consists of two compositional parts: on the right, figures of a teacher and two students; on the left, an image of petrochemical plant equipment with a storage tank and a freight train. The composition is crowned by an allegorical female figure representing Chemistry, holding a crystal object in her hands. Young Soviet scientists are shown fully devoted to their work, and the interconnection of education and knowledge-intensive production is also clearly expressed. Compositionally, the work is made in only four colors, in keeping with the surrounding architecture, and the artists used sculptural modeling techniques to give the figures volume and enrich the color scheme.

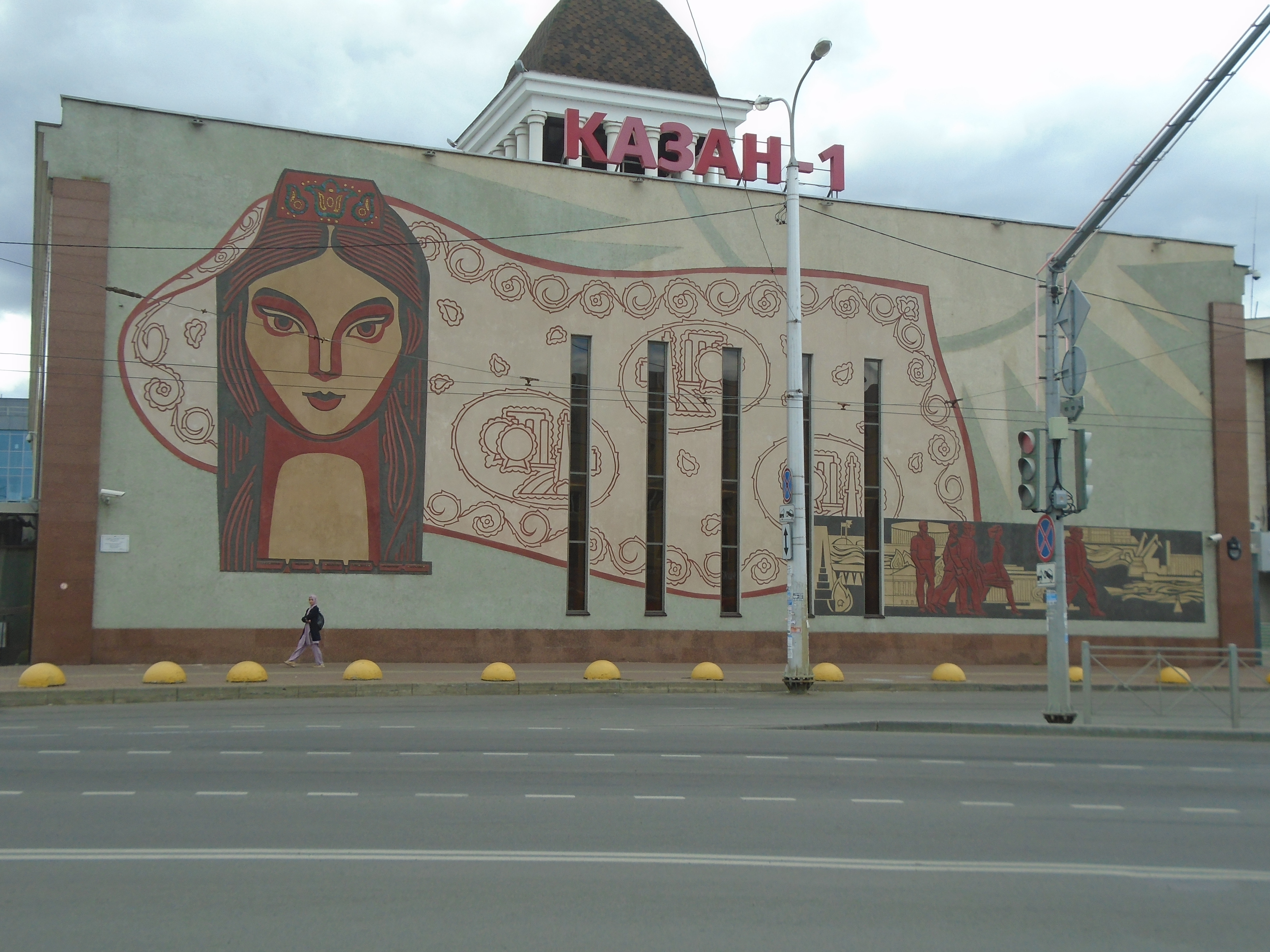
Railway station, Chernyshevsky Street

An important project of that period was the composition by Kildibekov, Bubennov, and Fyodorov titled Kazan — Capital of Soviet Tataria on the end wall of the new Kazan suburban railway station (architect Munir Khasyanovich Agishev), created in 1967 for the 50th anniversary of the October Revolution. Scope and scale, a synthesis of the arts, a combination of ceramics, concrete, pebbles, and glass, and the use of sgraffito and mosaic technique (by Bubennov and Fyodorov) together with stained glass, which was executed by Kildibekov, together produced a landmark work of monumental art for Tataria. A monumental image of a Tatar girl in a traditional headwear, with a slender, strict face and slightly slanted eyes framed by black braids, became a true personification of the republic. Her white headscarf, spread across the entire plane of the building's exterior wall as a schematic map of Tataria, is filled with images of oil derricks and folk embroidery patterns. Below is a mosaic silhouette of Kazan with figures of young men and women, the country's working generation. In several places the headscarf is cut by vertical strips of narrow stained-glass windows, which cleverly enhance the decorative richness and color scheme of the work. Kildibekov also created tempera murals in the station's interior on the theme The Development of Railway Transport in Our Country, which critics considered somewhat abstract and schematic, and thus less artistically successful. The mural was destroyed during the station's reconstruction in 2005, when only a single wall of the original building remained, with the sgraffito removed and then recreated as a copy of the original version.

New progress in the development of monumental art in Tatarstan came in 1967 with the decoration of the Hotel Tatarstan and the House of Tatar Cuisine, both built in Kazan for the 50th anniversary of the Tatar ASSR and marked by a large complex of decorative work. Kildibekov took part in decorating the hotel alongside Bubennov (lobby) and Fyodorov (main restaurant hall). He was assigned the banquet hall, which he decorated together with architect Inga Nazimovna Agisheva. The walls were faced with wooden panels of valuable wood species, with gaps filled by three-dimensional wrought decorative grilles bearing national ornament. The end wall was decorated with a panel on the theme of an ancient Tatar legend, featuring a colored-leather appliqué with copper-chasing insets in the form of masks of Shurale. The combination of blue and white leather with light silvery metal is, according to critics, distinguished by refined elegance in both its ornamental and figurative motifs. In the interiors of the House of Tatar Cuisine, decorated by Nikolai Stepanovich Artamonov and Valery Ivanovich Okhotin on motifs from Tatar folklore, Kildibekov likewise decorated the banquet hall with leather appliqués made at the Arsk National Footwear Factory. Six vertical panels in the form of Tatar towels made of white chrome leather, richly embroidered with colored leather, were framed by polished panels of light-colored wood. Although each room was decorated in a different material and had its own distinct tonality, the calm and clear rhythmic structure of this hall's composition fully followed the unified style and details of the other interiors, creating a cohesive overall impression. After the building's renovation in 2004, these panels by Kildibekov disappeared without a trace and have not survived.

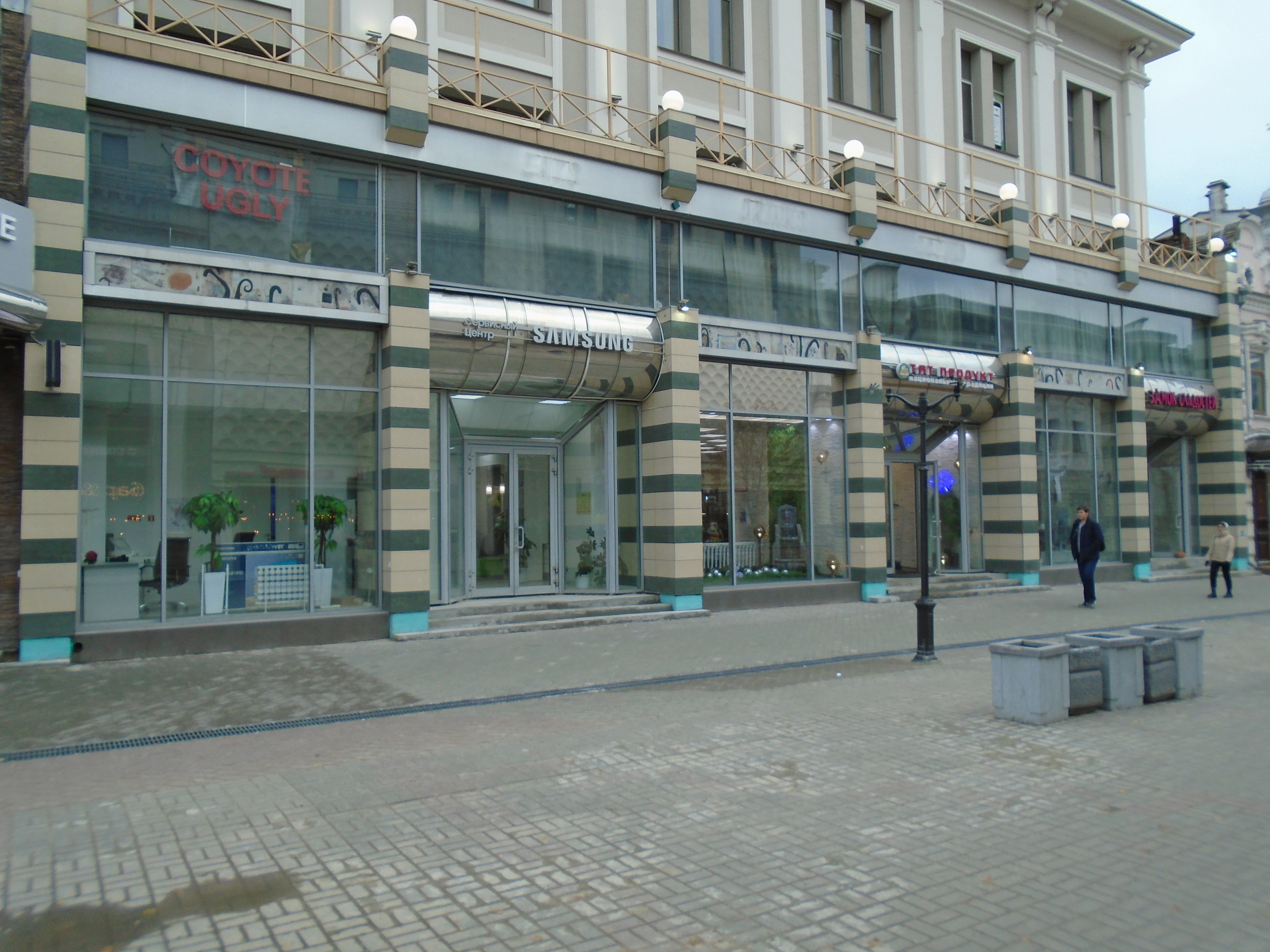
Reconstructed building of the former Detsky Mir store, Bauman Street

The construction boom that swept a number of cities in Tataria in the 1970s also marked a further rise in monumental-decorative art. Kildibekov also worked in partnership with the artist Valentin Valeryevich Karamyshev: together they decorated the walls of several buildings in Kazan. Their first joint work, in 1970, was the interior decoration of the Detsky Mir store, whose old building had already undergone major reconstruction in 1966. There Kildibekov and Karamyshev painted murals in the sales hall on the theme of children's life in different seasons of the year. During later reconstructions the building was completely rebuilt, losing its original appearance. Another joint work by Kildibekov and Karamyshev, in 1972, was a tempera mural on the theme Trade Relations of Tataria in the exhibition hall of a Kazan wholesale trading base. Narrow vertical panel-inset compositions told of trade relations with Egypt, India and Rus, depicting both early Russian merchants in Volga Bulgaria and Tatar merchants in Russia. Decorative originality, softness of color, and free imagination were combined here with historical accuracy in detail.

In 1969–1970 Kildibekov, together with Karamyshev and designer Alexander Alexandrovich Golubev, decorated the Gorky Palace of Culture in Zelenodolsk. In addition to a colored sgraffito, Round Dance of Friendship, on the exterior walls, they created a ceramic-tile mosaic, Romantics, in the Pioneer room, depicting children around a Pioneer campfire alongside scenes reflecting their dreams — travel by hot-air balloon, spaceflight, and the discovery of uninhabited islands. A major work for Kildibekov and Karamyshev in 1973 was the enormous smalt-glass mosaic Energy on the façade of the Energetic Palace of Culture for hydraulic engineers in the city of Naberezhnye Chelny. The composition consists of two figures, a young woman and a young man, holding a blue ribbon symbolizing the life-giving power of water. This broad blue border, occupying the space between the figures, becomes a background for images telling of the taming of the water element and its submission to the builders of power stations. Everything that water gives to people is here — white foamy patterns of waves and steep river currents pass through the sluices of a dam, transforming into a bright red sun of electric energy with lightning-bolt rays, which then becomes a garden city, blossoming, with golden-capped trees, growing new houses at the builders' feet. The mosaic is notable for its dynamism and the freshness and vibrancy of its color scheme.

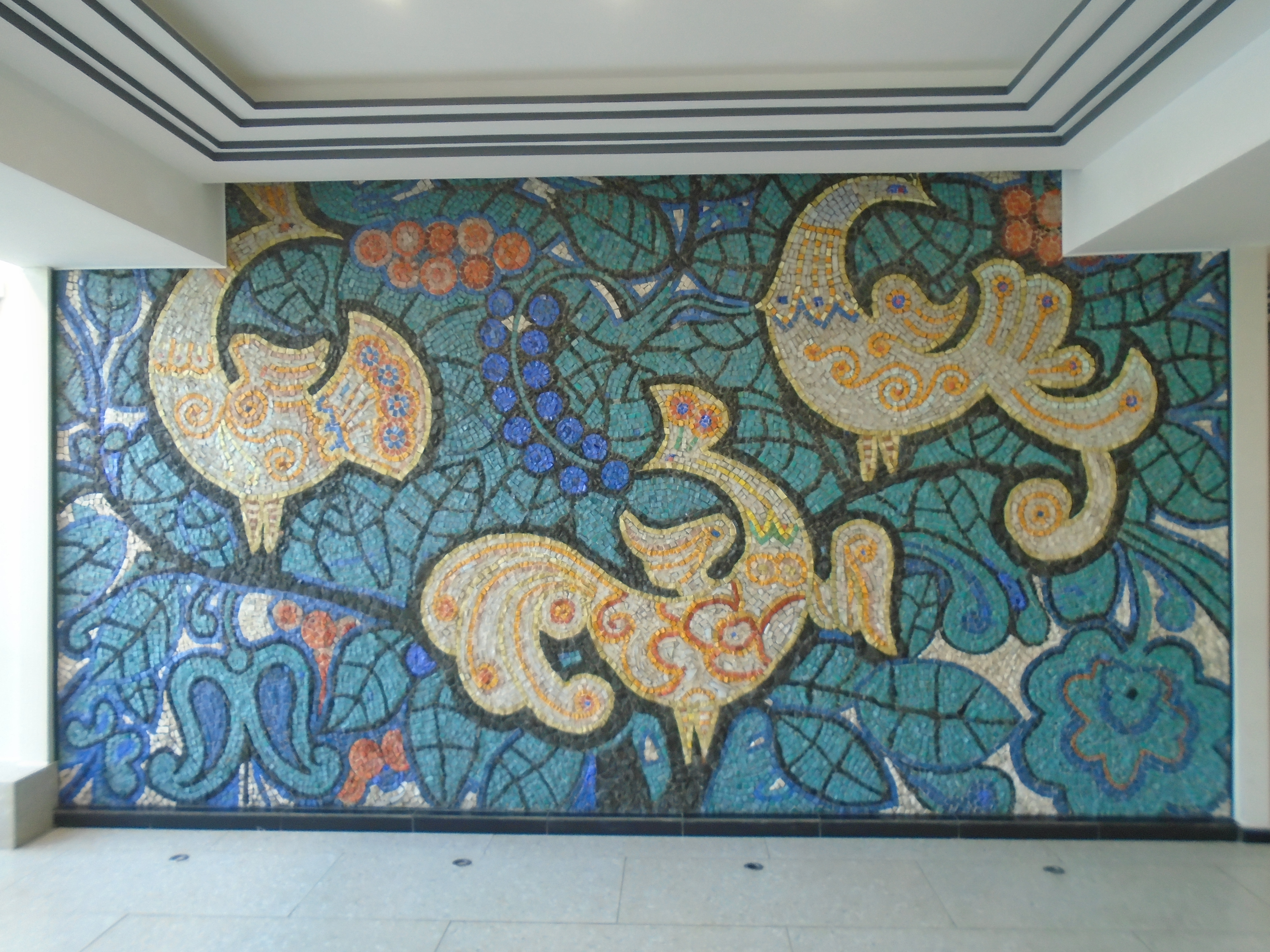
Panel Birds of Paradise, Saidash Cultural Centre, Yershov Street

The most significant project of this period was the Builders' Palace of Culture (1972), whose decoration was carried out in 1971. Despite ambivalent reception of the stained-glass solution for the façade, the mosaics in the auditorium, created by Kildibekov and Karamyshev, proved a great success and became their most beautiful and graceful work. On either side of the stage were three-figure compositions of festively dressed groups of young women on the theme Festival of the Arts, connected to the purpose of the building. The announcement of the festival, its decoration, and participation in it were expressed through the young women's figures — one with a horn, another with a torch, a third with flowers in her hands — while the remaining three released birds into flight, symbolizing songs flying into the hall from the stage. This was the first use of gold smalt mosaic in Kazan altogether, notable for the elegance and lightness of its silhouette solutions and its subtle resonance with motifs of Tatar folk art. The smalt did not cover the images but merely traced them in a thin gold outline, akin to old Tatar embroidery in gold and beads on green velvet. Critics also noted the strong impression made by the noble shimmer of this gold against the green background of the wall. In the ground-floor lobby of the building Kildibekov also created the mosaic Birds of Paradise, notable for its contrasting combination of blue and yellow-orange tones and its rhythmic structure and ornamentality in the treatment of the birds themselves. The palace of culture was later reconstructed, and the auditorium mosaics were lost.

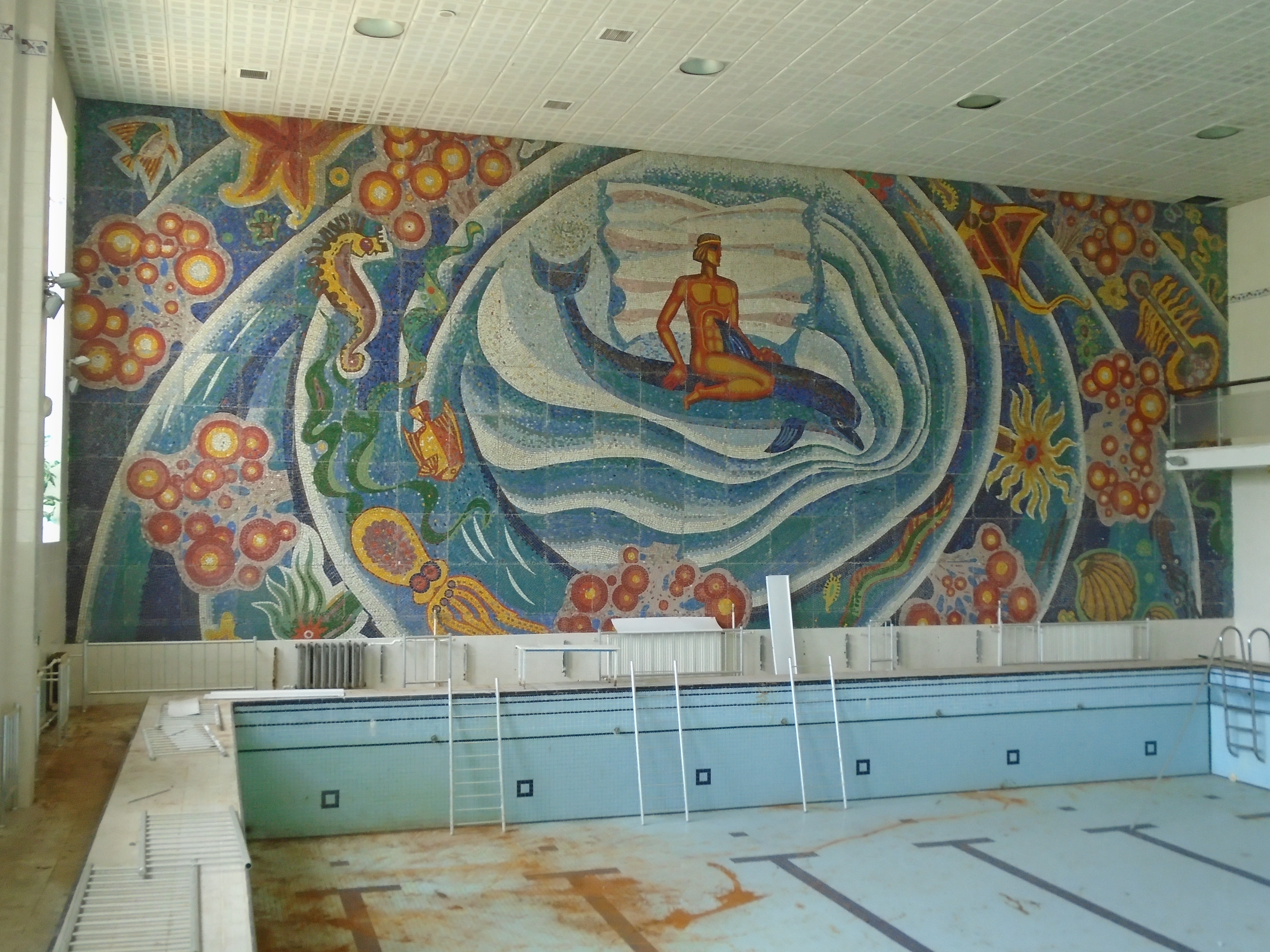
Mosaic in the pool of the Youth Centre, Dekabristov Street

In 1971, Kildibekov and Andrei Lavrentyevich Prokopyev created a monumental wall panel titled Musicians in the Kazan restaurant Vostok, to a design by Vladimir Alexandrovich Popov, alongside At the Spring by Abrek Amirovich Abzgildin and The Hunt by the same artist and Valery Ivanovich Okhotin. Following the manner of murals by Chingiz Akhmarov and executed in the technique of oil painting on wax emulsion, this interior decoration was distinguished by the softness of its color palette, the elegance of its drawing, and its aesthetic expressiveness, in addition to its subtle rendering of the world of Eastern poetic imagery. In 1975, Kildibekov created the colored smalt mosaic Land of Menzelinsk on the façade of the Palace of Culture in Menzelinsk, one of the first monumental works in that city. The theme is conveyed through an allegorical female figure and through heraldry symbolizing the labor of the people of Menzelinsk. The mosaic is organically tied to the façade, and through its free asymmetry seems to flow across its entire surface, which harmonizes well with the expressiveness of the shimmering, painterly material itself.

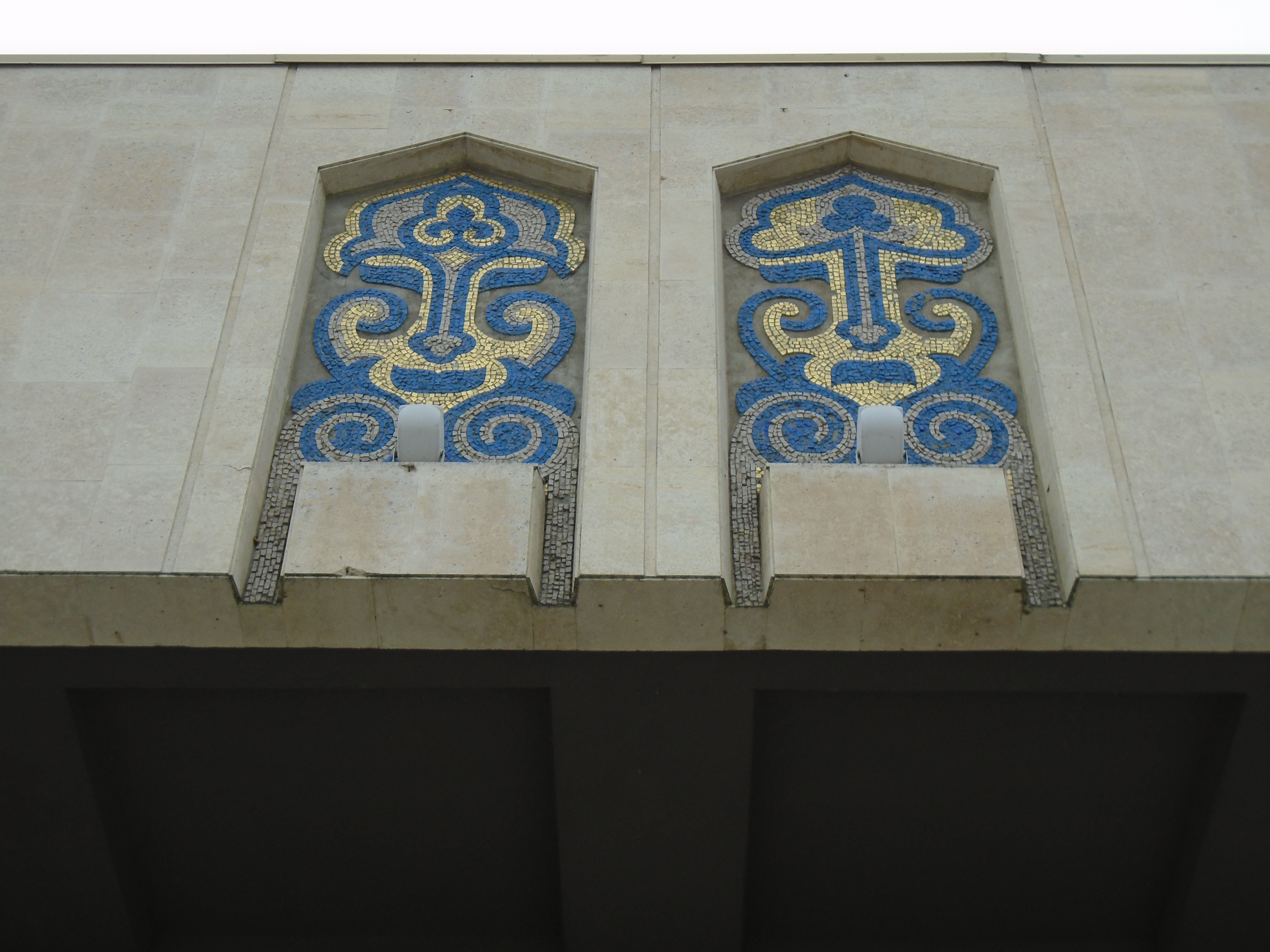
Mosaics of the Kamal Theatre

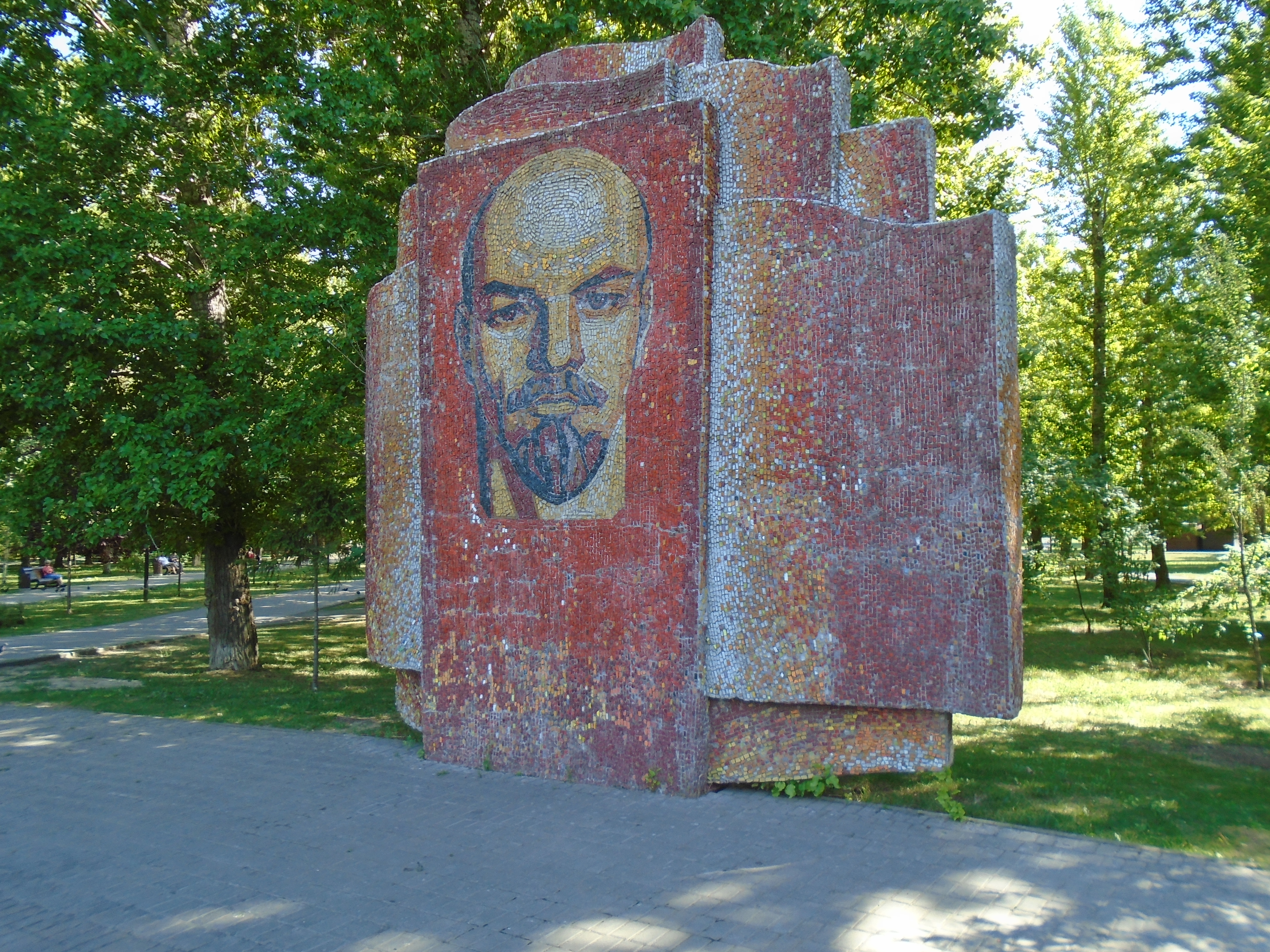
Panel Lenin, park on Tatarstan Street

Kildibekov and Bubennov's sgraffito The Victory of Communism Is Inevitable in a small park on Gagarin Street (dated to the 1970s) and is dedicated to a theme topical at the time — the union of industry, labor, and education. The left part of the work is occupied by a portrait of Vladimir Lenin, the right by the slogan itself, with workers at a machine, builders, students, and young people with tools of production depicted alongside. The color scheme is executed in brick red, white, gray, dark gray, gray-green, and beige, with Lenin depicted in two colors as an unobtrusive ideological symbol, while the other figures are schematic and resemble the sgraffito on the Hotel Volga. Kildibekov also created a stained-glass window in the building of an educational-production complex in Kazan (1976); the mosaic panel Lenin (1976) in the Baumansky District; a smalt mosaic, Seasons, on the themes of spring and summer (1978), and an oil mural, The Spring (1979), on the façades of buildings of the Kazansky sanatorium; a smalt mosaic panel with a dolphin on the pool wall (1977) and an oil mural, Dialectics (1983–1984), at the Youth Centre on Dekabristov Street; and mosaics depicting Shurale on the façade of the Galiasgar Kamal Tatar Academic Theatre (1985). The works of Tatar monumentalist artists, including Kildibekov, took their place in the history of the republic's art, becoming part of the historical face of its cities. Nevertheless, the buildings' owners take little care to preserve them, destroying them or covering them with new façades, and over the years of reconstruction of Kazan's historic center many unique works of monumental art have been destroyed, effectively bringing the development of this art form to a halt.

=== Painting, graphic art, decorative and applied art, tapestries ===
As a graduate of the Lviv art institute, Kildibekov, along with his contemporary Erot Yakubovich Zaripov, was significantly influenced by the art of Western Ukraine and its decorative aesthetics. He had gone to Lviv partly in an attempt to escape the strict ideological dictates of socialist realism then prevailing in Kazan, following his friend Georgy Arkadyevich Zyablitsev there. The city, which had become a center for the flourishing of Ukrainian decorative and applied art, attracted Kildibekov with its creative freedom, in particular the opportunity to study the work of the Impressionists. Having mastered the specifics of decorative and applied art, painting, and graphic art already during his student years, aided by the very profile of the Lviv art institute, upon his return to Kazan Kildibekov confidently and boldly announced himself with a series of notable works, while shunning any kind of ideological commitment and avoiding both the rebelliousness of the Sixtiers generation and the stagnant, conservative strain of socialist realism. According to Dina Diasovna Khisamova, he became part of the circle of artists who made up the nonconformist wave in the republic's art of the 1960s. Abstraction and unconventionality could exist only privately, in a kind of informal community and at private apartment gatherings, in which Kildibekov took part, becoming friends with such figures from the art world as Alexei Avdeyevich Anikeyenok, Anatoly Ivanovich Novitsky, Rustem Adelshevich Kutuy, Vil Salakhovich Mustafin, and Dias Nazikhovich Valeev. Having come of age during the period when the Soviet art world was discovering the work of the Impressionists, Cubists, and avant-garde artists, he immediately settled, in his own work, on an aesthetic novel for Tatarstan — a decorativism combining a gaze into the past and antiquity, the symbolism and imagery of pagan and Bulgar art, and the bright colors and coloristic sensibility of Tatar decorative and applied art.

Folk art, with its combination of simplicity of compositional solutions and a richness of vitality, played the principal role in shaping Kildibekov's creative individuality. According to critics, he realized himself most fully and deeply in his easel works, in painting and graphic art, where the artist's reflections and views on life, the world, and people are vividly expressed. Uninterested in historical events of the past as such, the artist instead turned his gaze toward what his ancestors had lived by — the art, crafts, and objects they created. From his earliest works, Kildibekov focused on the search for aesthetic and moral ideals and the plastic means to express them through the most ordinary and prosaic objects. His easel works are distinguished by decorative and plastic richness, deep symbolic generalization of imagery, and a variety of color and tonal transitions in the depiction of nature, which determined the subsequent direction of Kildibekov's art. He was particularly drawn to dark green and blue, crepuscular tones, which, in the view of critics, speaks to the philosophical depth of the artist's work. On the whole, Kildibekov's art attracts attention through its remarkable coherence and depth, its particular spirituality, and a certain reticence, and his works, free of ostentation, immerse the viewer in an atmosphere of reflection, setting a contemplative and lyrical mood.

Initially, following the creative approach of his student years in the spirit of depict what I'm seeing, Kildibekov was drawn to the direct rendering of the complexity of planes and the color and tonal transitions of nature; before long, however, this manner ceased to satisfy him, and the artist turned toward not so much observation as analysis of the surrounding reality, its transformation and stylization, and the revelation of its essence, combined with a rational structuring, precision of composition, and the creation of a clear plastic and coloristic rhythm. In his searching, Kildibekov leaned at times toward primitive archaism, at times toward the expressive tangibility of Kuzma Petrov-Vodkin's objects, or toward the abstractionism of Pablo Picasso, drawing attention through the diversity of his themes. The selection of subjects is, in general, of great importance for Kildibekov; his work contains almost no signs of contemporary reality. On the contrary, the artist was preoccupied with exploring traditional and eternal matters, deliberately limiting himself to scenes of everyday life, portraits of family and acquaintances, understated historical subjects, still lifes, and depictions of nature untouched by human intervention. The results of this artistic process — the shaping of his own style — became apparent by the mid-1960s, as evidenced by such representative works as Lacemakers (1962–1964), Conversation. Old Man with a Fish, Self-Portrait on a Blue Background, Portrait of the Artist's Wife (all 1964), and Boy on a Red Horse (1965).

The underlying basis of the painting Conversation. Old Man with a Fish was Kildibekov's inclination toward posing and interpreting universal human problems. The canvas depicts an old man, a person at the end of life's journey. His face, etched with wrinkles, reflects deep reflection, an inner dialogue with himself, with his second self. The old man is taking stock of his life; the swinging pendulum of a wall clock hastens time, while the fish lying on the table before him appears as a symbol of silence. The restraint of the color palette only reinforces the painting's reticence. According to critics, the painting "caused a stir" in Kazan; Kildibekov was called a formalist, and viewers and members of exhibition committees asked bewildered questions — why a conversation, why an old man with a fish, was he talking to it? In fact, this compositional choice can be explained simply by the fact that the fish serves merely as a plastic element needed to organize the space and fix the viewer's gaze, and its place could have been taken by virtually any object. At the same time, a symbolic narrative is revealed through the painting's realistic depiction, one that leads the viewer to philosophical reflection and a desire to understand something important about the content of human life, of being, and perhaps even the origins of the universe. The realistic composition of Lacemakers is likewise filled with symbolism embedded in the most ordinary things. The long white lace being woven by the young women appears as a bright road of life, representing what they dream of and what awaits them ahead. This light, translucent, festive canvas testified to the artist's establishment of new principles for organizing the painted canvas. The painting, based on impressions Kildibekov gained in Rostov, also speaks to the beauty of labor and beloved work, marking the start of an entire series of works on Tatar folk crafts.

Such are the works Arsk Still Life (1974), Arsk Craftswomen (1974), and Kukmor Felt Boots (1978), in which, according to critics, the artist's national worldview is expressed with such power that it is very difficult to understand the history of Tatar art without them. Kildibekov depicts both the craftsmen who work in leather and felt-boot makers, and the objects of folk craft themselves, which in his works appear as genuine works of art. In this connection, one of the artist's most iconic and canonical works is the painting Kukmor Felt Boots, which depicts a felt-boot maker who, judging by his characteristic tan, is already preparing in summer for his winter labor. The blend of folk and avant-garde neo-primitivist currents on display here, along with pictorial devices and quotations from the art of different eras — characteristic of unofficial Soviet art — marked the flowering of Kildibekov as a painter and as an artist of the world. Also considered one of his finest works is Arsk Still Life, created based on the work of the craftswomen at the Arsk National Footwear Factory. Beneath blue windows is depicted a pink table with pieces of cut leather laid out on it, and on the floor stands a whole parade of finished ichigi boots, festive, scarlet, and yellow. The still life as a genre was, in Kildibekov's hands, generally transformed into a kind of painted "interior." His depictions of tidy, cozy, festive Tatar cottages are distinguished by refined taste, a spiritualization of the material world, and a particular sensitivity to the poetry of objects. The soft bluish whiteness of the stove, the gleam of a freshly painted clean floor, patterned patchwork quilts and rugs, starchy, delicate lace — all of these are imbued in Kildibekov's works with a particular animation of simple things. Even greater decorativeness and expression of emotional depth and stylistic unity characterize the paintings Good Morning! (1973) and Nude. Love (1976). The latter is known in several versions, but it is the 1976 work that stands out for the elegance of its drawing, stylized after an Eastern miniature, and the fiery intensity of its red color.

Among other artists of the 1960s–1970s, Kildibekov distinguished himself particularly through a number of studies in the landscape genre. His urban and rural views are landscapes of mood — sometimes faded yellow-brown, sometimes bluish, sometimes white and golden, sometimes green and vivid. Kildibekov's portraiture is likewise marked by stylizing tendencies, for example in the genre of self-portrait, and in his portraits of craftswomen and collective-farm workers at the Arsk National Footwear Factory. These are executed expressively and concisely, in a conventional, fantastical palette, with greenish, blue, and scarlet faces, reflecting a conscious aesthetic orientation on the artist's part toward archaization and the primitivism of folk art and medieval art. This engagement with folk imagination is accompanied by a striving for poetic metaphor, an effort to reveal the creative essence within the depicted image, which is especially evident in his portraits of cultural figures. Kildibekov's portrait gallery of his contemporaries is notable for its perceptiveness, psychological depth, and humanity, with each image capturing certain profound traits of character. His female portraits are especially masterful (Albina, Portrait of Gulsina, Portrait of a Woman Artist), in which the artist revealed the particulars of each subject's fate and portrayed them in the full charm and appeal of their feminine nature. Kildibekov also achieved success in the genre of the nude, his interpretation of the female body combining his own deeply personal, emotionally sensuous, sexual perception with an evocation of Eastern and Islamic romanticism, Tatar antiquity, and folk life.

The range of Kildibekov's graphic work is notable for its breadth; he worked in various techniques, drawing with pen and ink, gouache and watercolor, felt-tip pen, sanguine crayon, and pencil, revealing everywhere his command of color and subtle tonal transitions. His graphic series Harmony in Stone, for instance, is distinguished by the perfection of its execution, depicting outstanding monuments of ancient architecture — stone cathedrals seemingly frozen in music, delighting the eye with the perfection of their proportions, the beauty of their silhouettes, and the diversity of their architectural forms. A special place in Kildibekov's graphic work is occupied by an easel series of drawings in tempera on paper and board, created in 1967 on the themes of Tatar folk tales. The heroes of these works are figures from national folklore — Gulchechek, Altynchech, Ay-kyzy, Su Anasy, and Shurale. The most expressive are the lyrical images of the young women, presented in a stylized world. White drawings on a black background emit a distinctive shimmer, their smooth contours formed by thin, melodic lines, reminiscent of Tatar embroidery in silver on black velvet or silver jewelry with niello work. Silhouettes, dresses, and braids, and everything surrounding them — a small flat island of earth covered in flowers, or a moon resembling a large silver jeweled brooch — are all outlined in white. National character is expressed in the ornamental and patterned compositional solutions, and in the fascination with expressive rhythms. Critics have also noted a connection between this striking use of background and the influence of Western Ukrainian wood carving covered in black lacquer. These works marked Kildibekov's conscious turn toward laconicism and self-restraint in the use of artistic means, which, combined with his engagement with the imagery and elements of folk art, filled his works with poetic metaphor.

Kildibekov also contributed to the development of poster art. Such works of his are distinguished both by elegance of drawing and by clear, persuasive expression of thought, all within a restrained and austere palette of soft, muted, cool tones. A characteristic feature of Kildibekov's posters is the active use of national motifs and imagery, and engagement with the heritage of Tatar culture, as, for example, in the poster A True Person Always Strives for Knowledge (1962), based on words by Gabdulla Tukay. Kildibekov was among the first to create a series of posters on local themes, united by a single idea under the motto "Your City Is Your Home; Take Care of It!," including Whose? and Have You Planted Your Tree? Especially well received by critics was a poster from this series titled Let's Dress Kazan in Bright Green (1962). The foreground of the composition is occupied by a young Tatar woman in a blue headscarf against a light-green background of earth, together with young people planting greenery along the streets. She herself is planting a fragile sapling, while in the distance a panorama of the city unfolds, crowned by the bluish silhouette of the Kazan Kremlin. The thin trunk and delicate shoots of the young tree, the careful hands and slender figure of the young woman — all of this fills the composition with an atmosphere of spring, freshness, youth, and vigor, while the rhythm and color further heighten the poster's impact on the viewer. One of Kildibekov's finest works is the poster How Well Your May Day Attire Suits You, Tataria! (1968). The poster's message is conveyed through a device of visual metamorphosis — the pattern on a young woman's dress transforms into columns of demonstrators filling the spacious streets, woven into the folds of her dress. The subtlety and elegance of the drawing of her face's oval shape, the cut of her eyes, her hands, and the headscarf flying up above her shoulders recall Kildibekov's easel graphic work. The decorative quality of the artistic form is expressed in the resonant combination of red and blue, while national imagery is revealed in a pattern of flowers and leaves evoking the motifs of Tatar folk embroidery, forming a beautiful completion of the poster's composition.

By the mid-1970s Kildibekov's art had reached artistic maturity and the highest degree of energetic intensity. His ability to penetrate deeply into life and the essence of things and events was accompanied by an organic reworking of the experience of medieval art, icon painting, and Persian miniature painting, which only strengthened the possibilities of his artistic style. The artist frequently employed reverse perspective and a flattening of space, heightening the impact through color and subtle tonal development, while avoiding narrative explicitness and leaving a degree of reticence that drew the viewer into their own reflective process. Kildibekov became increasingly drawn to antiquity and the distant past, and works featuring images of Muslim poets, philosophers, and Sufis, reflecting on the transience of life and the necessity of honest human existence on earth, came to occupy a prominent place in his art. In his historical compositions he brought distant and recent times together, imbuing them with the poignancy of a modern worldview while depicting the way of life and images of people in a traditional form, as if taken from the past. Themes of spiritual tradition, reflection on the history of the Tatar people, and tragic events and fates of the nation permeate such philosophical works by Kildibekov as Kul Gali (1985), Tatar Poetesses of the 19th Century (1984), Old Woman with Brushwood (1990), A Visit (1991), Pilgrims (1992), Return (1992), Nostalgia (1999), Dancing Sufi (2003), Falconry (2003), and Winter in Kasimov. Söyembikä with Her Son (2005).

The personality and poetry of Gabdulla Tukay are among the central themes in Kildibekov's art, and his works on this subject marked a new stage in the deep exploration of the poet's image in painting. A poetic and romantic attitude toward life finds its fullest expression in the painting From the Lyrics of G. Tukay (1986), which, in the words of Rozalina Gumerovna Shageyeva, is "one of the finest canvases in the art of Tatarstan." The composition is imbued with a range of emotion from rapture to sorrow, stylistically following the Art Nouveau. At the center of the work is a large mirror, on either side of which are depicted the poet and a young woman. The mirror plays a symbolic role as a sacred object that accompanies a person through life while also containing something unresolved, unknown, and inaccessible. Tukay and his unrequited love, Zaytuna, are separated by the world beyond the mirror, a realm beyond human control that may have stolen and consumed their happiness. Huddled against the cold in his coat, Tukay in his solitude has almost merged with the eternal nature surrounding him, becoming as much a constant as it is itself — and it is in this sorrow, according to critics, that the truest perception of the poet's fate lies.

Critics consider the painting Together (2013) a defining work of Kildibekov's mature period, and one of the finest achievements both in his own art and in the art of Tatarstan as a whole. The artist depicted himself alongside his wife — his love, his muse, his friend — together they created beauty and art, their thoughts and feelings intertwined. In her hands is a ball of woolen thread, its ends stretching toward his hands. The skein of yarn in the artist's palms steadily diminishes, as if the Kildibekov couple, who had lived together for decades, were unwinding the thread of life itself. Critics suggest that this canvas points to the idea that the foundation of Kildibekov's life and art was love — elevated, pure, and moving — which had guided him from his very first steps in art, along paths that were at times difficult and arduous. The composition of the painting is suffused with a deep inner bond between the artist and his wife, and, as a result, with a spiritual richness that seems to encompass all the joys and sufferings that fall to a person's lot in life. Compared to a similar painting by Geliy Korzhev, Lovers, which depicts an older couple, or The Two by Viktor Popkov, depicting two young people unaware of what lies ahead of them.

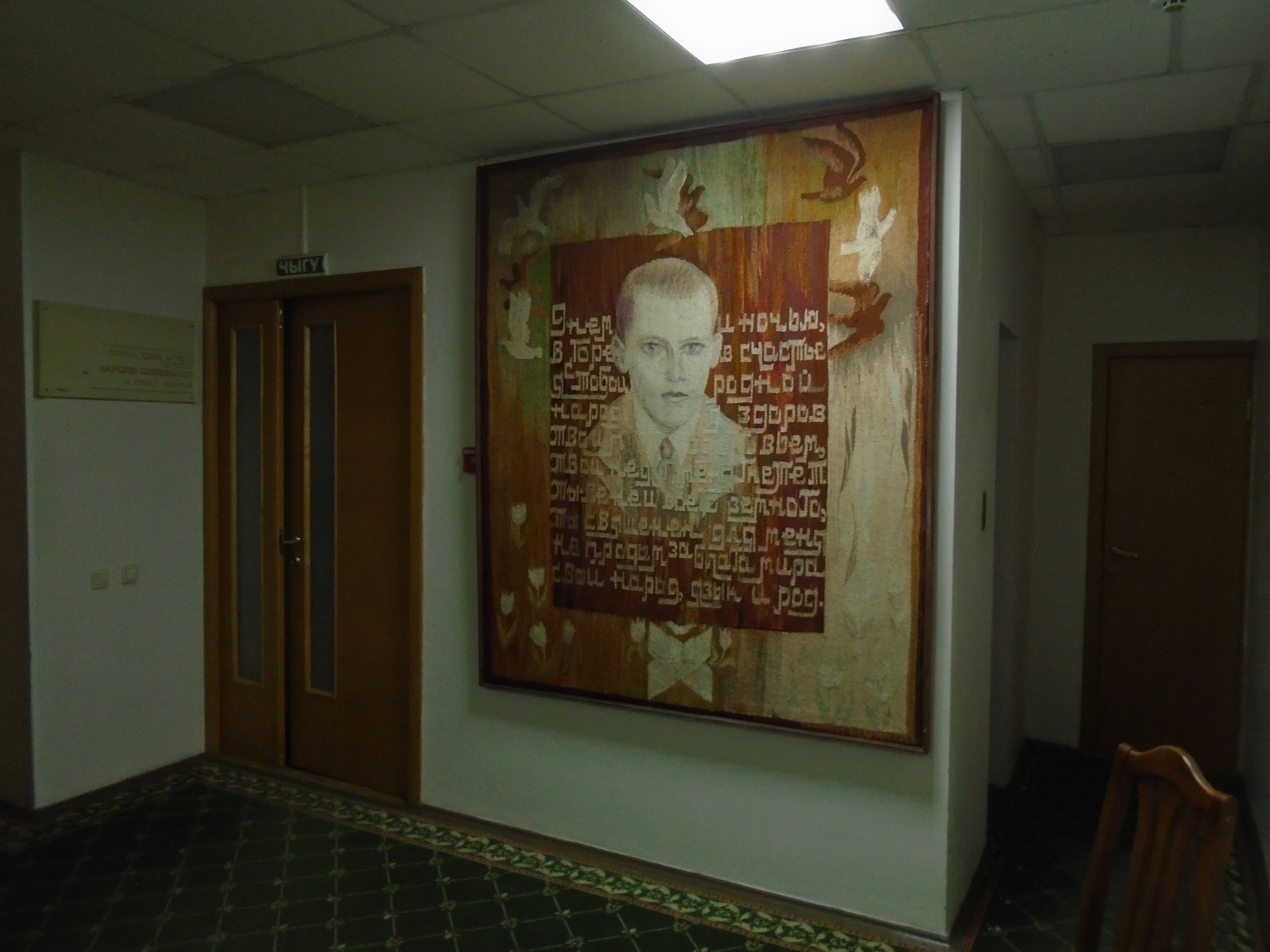
Tapestry G. Tukay, Kamal Theatre

Through his intensive search for original imagery across different art forms, Kildibekov had a stimulating influence on the work of his wife, who created tapestries. This art form in fact occupies a special place in the artist's body of work, given that before the Kildibekov couple's arrival in Tatarstan, tapestry as such had not existed in the tradition of Tatar art. Because hand weaving is one of the most ancient Tatar crafts, one that had since disappeared without leaving surviving examples, the Kildibekov couple did a great deal of work to revive and develop this art form and to apply technical methods to the expression of artistic intent. The tapestries created by Kildibekov from his own designs, in collaboration with his wife, who executed the work, echo the artist's paintings both thematically and stylistically — they are devoted to subjects from the life, history, and folklore of the Tatar people, national holidays, folk tales, and rituals. The series Circus, a set of designs for tapestries for the Kazan circus building erected in 1967, stands out for its independent graphic significance. Among the Kildibekovs' works, critics have noted the monumental tapestry for the demonstration hall of the House of Everyday Services (Dom Byta) in Kazan; Roses and Flowers in the Interior for a Kazan restaurant and café on Tolstoy Street; "Decorative," for the wedding hall of the civil registry office (ZAGS) in Leninogorsk; as well as G. Tukay and The Beginning for the Kamal Theatre; The Sayar' Troupe, depicting the first Tatar theatrical troupe, Sayar; and the triptych Based on Folk Tales (Su Anasy, Sak-Sok, Shurale). As a gifted painter and colorist, Kildibekov, together with his wife, established his own line within Tatar tapestry art, and their works, according to critics, are always recognizable and unique for their deep connections to folk tradition.

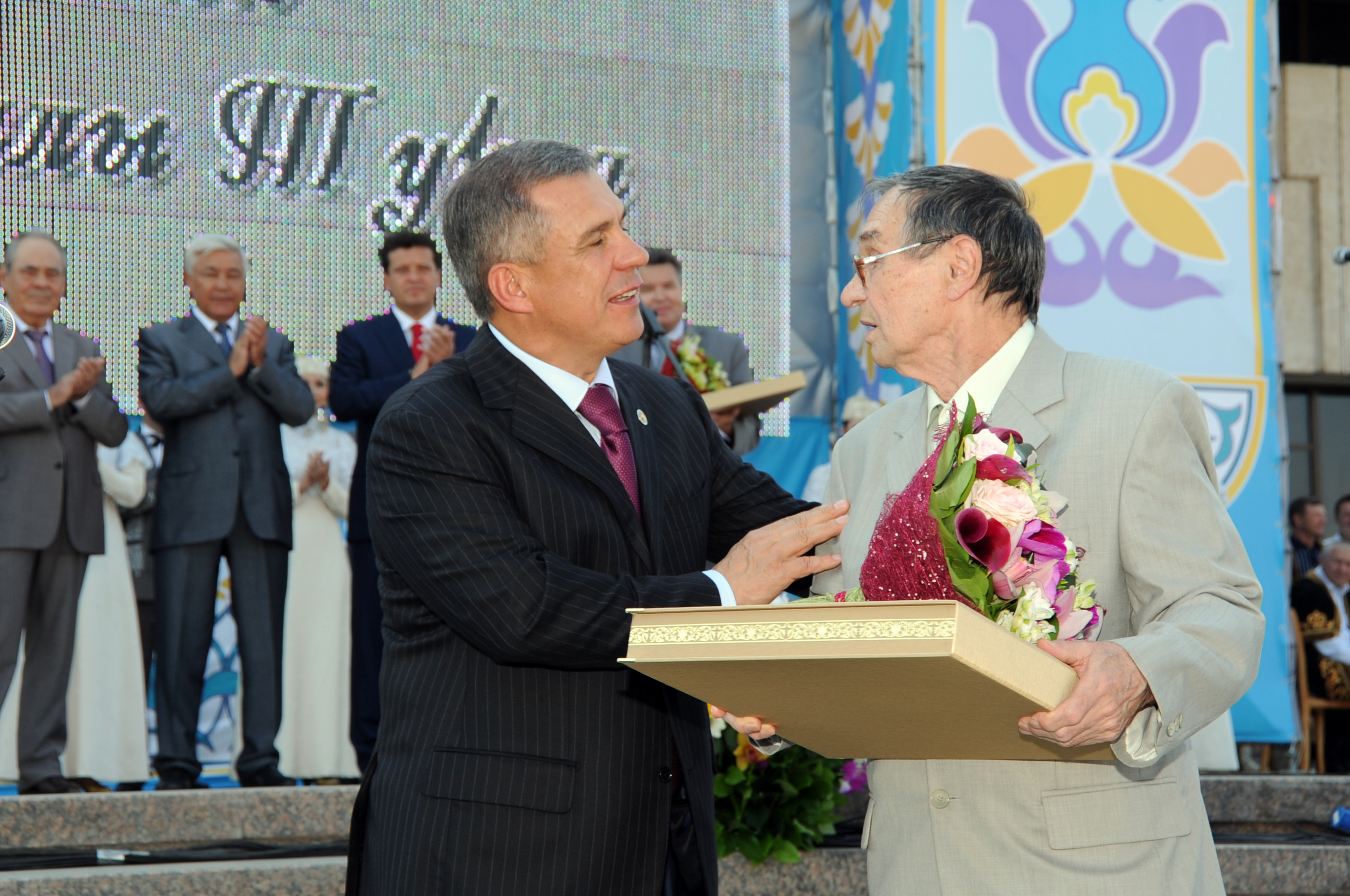
At the presentation of the Tukay Prize, 2011

== Awards ==
- Honorary title of Honored Artist of the Russian Federation (2011) — for services to the fine arts.
- Honorary title of People's Artist of the Republic of Tatarstan (2006).
- Honorary title of Honored Art Worker of the Tatar SSR (1991).
- Gabdulla Tukay State Prize of the Republic of Tatarstan (2011, jointly with his wife) — for joint works of monumental and applied decorative art created for the interiors and exteriors of public buildings in the Republic of Tatarstan, and for a series of paintings: monumental "mosaic" and "sgraffito" work at the Volga and Tatarstan hotel complexes, the Galiasgar Kamal Tatar State Academic Theatre, and elsewhere; the tapestries The Sayar Troupe and the triptych Based on Folk Tales (Su Anasy, Sak-Sok, Shurale); and a series of paintings devoted to the history and culture of the Tatar people, including Kukmor Felt Boots, Poetesses, Pilgrims, Return, Dancing Dervish, and others. The prize was presented by President of the Republic of Tatarstan Rustam Minnikhanov at a ceremony on the square in front of the Kamal Theatre.
- Medal "For Valorous Labor" (2015) — for a major contribution to the development of the fine arts and many years of creative work. Presented by the Chairman of the Cabinet of Ministers of the Republic of Tatarstan Ildar Shafkatovich Khalikov at a ceremony at the Kazan Kremlin.
- Letter of Gratitude from the President of the Republic of Tatarstan (2010).
- Gold Medal of the Union of Artists of Russia "Spirituality. Traditions. Mastery" (2012).

== Bibliography ==
- Kuzmin, Valery Vladimirovich; Smykov, Yuri Ilyich; Khalikov, Alfred Khasanovich, eds. (1977). Казань: Путеводитель [Kazan: A Guide] (in Russian). Kazan: Tatar Book Publishing House. p. 224.
- Voltsenburg, Oskar Eduardovich, ed. (1995). "Кильдибеков Рустем Ахмедович" [Rustem Akhmedovich Kildibekov]. Художники народов СССР. Биобиблиографический словарь в 6 томах [Artists of the Peoples of the USSR: A Biobibliographic Dictionary in 6 Volumes] (in Russian). Vol. 4, book 2: Kaev–Kobozev. compiled; published by Yuri Alexandrovich Bystrov and Mikhail Yuryevich Evseviev. Saint Petersburg: Akademichesky Proekt Humanitarian Agency. p. 435. ISBN 5733100419.
- Khasanov, Mansur Khasanovich, ed. (1998). "Кильдибеков Рустем Ахметович" [Rustem Akhmetovich Kildibekov]. Татарский энциклопедический словарь [Tatar Encyclopedic Dictionary] (in Russian). Kazan: Institute of the Tatar Encyclopedia, Academy of Sciences of the Republic of Tatarstan. p. 274. ISBN 0953065030.
- Valeeva, Dina Karimovna, ed. (2016). Рустем Кильдибеков [Rustem Kildibekov] (in Russian). Kazan: Zaman Publishing House. p. 159. ISBN 9785442800951.
- Khisamova, Dina Diasovna; et al., eds. (2020). После «оттепели». Искусство 1970—1980-х годов. Каталог выставки «После „оттепели“. Искусство 1970–1980-х годов», 24 мая 2018 — 9 сентября 2018 [After the "Thaw." Art of the 1970s–1980s. Catalogue of the exhibition "After the 'Thaw.' Art of the 1970s–1980s," 24 May 2018 – 9 September 2018] (PDF) (in Russian). Kazan: Zaman Publishing House. p. 144. ISBN 9785442801545.
- Almazova, Aida Abdrakhmanovna (2013). Художественная культура Татарстана в контексте социальных процессов и духовных традиций: очерки [The Artistic Culture of Tatarstan in the Context of Social Processes and Spiritual Traditions: Essays] (PDF) (in Russian). Kazan: Kazan University Press. p. 246. ISBN 9785000190722.
- Amirkhanov, Rafik Khazimovich (2010). "Родословная Кильдибековых" [The Genealogy of the Kildibekovs] (PDF). Татарские мурзы и дворяне: история и современность: сборник статей [Tatar Murzas and Nobles: History and Modernity: A Collection of Articles] (in Russian). Kazan: Marjani Institute of History, Academy of Sciences of the Republic of Tatarstan. pp. 133–156. ISBN 9785949811511.
- Valeeva, Dina Karimovna (2015). "Клубок любви Рустема Кильдибекова" [Rustem Kildibekov's Tangle of Love]. Казань [Kazan] (in Russian) (3). Kazan: 78–89.
- Epifanova, Viktoria Sergeyevna (2022). "Технология сграффито в оформлении учебных заведений (на примере Советского района г. Казани)" [Sgraffito Technique in the Decoration of Educational Institutions (Using the Example of the Sovetsky District of Kazan)]. In Zelenko, Natalia Vasilyevna; Shteingardt, Nina Sergeyevna (eds.). Студенческая наука — образованию: материалы Всероссийской студенческой научно-практической конференции (14 апреля 2022 года) [Student Science for Education: Proceedings of the All-Russian Student Scientific and Practical Conference (14 April 2022)] (PDF) (in Russian). Armavir: Armavir State Pedagogical University. pp. 186–193. ISBN 9785899718922.
- Musabirova, Rozalina Mirsayafovna (2020). Зарисовки детства: из истории детских художественных школ г. Казани [Sketches of Childhood: From the History of Children's Art Schools in Kazan] (in Russian). Kazan: Kazanskaya Nedvizhimost Publishing House. ISBN 9785604405826.
- Novitsky, Anatoly Ivanovich (2016). "Палитра добра и вдохновения (к 60-летию Р. А. Кильдибекова и в связи с его большой выставкой в Государственном музее изобразительных искусств Республики Татарстан, 1994 г.)" [A Palette of Kindness and Inspiration (On the 60th Anniversary of R. A. Kildibekov and in Connection with His Major Exhibition at the State Museum of Fine Arts of the Republic of Tatarstan, 1994)]. In Valeeva, Dina Karimovna (ed.). Рустем Кильдибеков [Rustem Kildibekov] (in Russian). Kazan: Zaman Publishing House. pp. 15–19. ISBN 9785442800951.
- Ostroumov, Vsevolod Petrovich (1978). Казань. Очерки по истории города и его архитектуры [Kazan: Essays on the History of the City and Its Architecture] (in Russian). Kazan: Kazan University Press. p. 293.
- Sultanova, Rauza Rifkatovna (2001). Искусство новых городов Татарстана (1960—1990 гг.): живопись, графика, монументально-декоративное искусство, скульптура [The Art of the New Cities of Tatarstan (1960–1990): Painting, Graphic Art, Monumental-Decorative Art, Sculpture] (in Russian). Kazan: G. Ibragimov Institute of Language, Literature and Art, Academy of Sciences of the Republic of Tatarstan. p. 192.
- Tkachenko, Vladimir Alekseyevich (2006). "Попытка разговора с веками. Становление и развитие монументального искусства в советский период Татарстана" [An Attempt to Speak Across the Centuries: The Formation and Development of Monumental Art in the Soviet Period of Tatarstan]. Казань [Kazan] (in Russian) (8–9). Kazan: 140–150.
- Fainberg, Avraam Borisovich (1983). Художники Татарии [Artists of Tataria] (in Russian). Leningrad: Khudozhnik RSFSR. p. 232.
- Khisamova, Dina Diasovna (2006). "Кильдибеков Рустем Ахметович" [Rustem Akhmetovich Kildibekov]. In Khasanov, Mansur Khasanovich (ed.). Татарская энциклопедия [Tatar Encyclopedia] (in Russian). Vol. 3: K–L. Kazan: Institute of the Tatar Encyclopedia, Academy of Sciences of the Republic of Tatarstan. p. 291. ISBN 9785852470355.
- Chervonnaya, Svetlana Mikhailovna (1975). "Кильдибеков Рустем Ахмедович" [Rustem Akhmedovich Kildibekov]. Художники Советской Татарии: биографический справочник [Artists of Soviet Tataria: A Biographical Reference Book] (in Russian). Kazan: Tatar Book Publishing House. pp. 89–90.
- Chervonnaya, Svetlana Mikhailovna (1978). Искусство Советской Татарии: Живопись. Скульптура. Графика [The Art of Soviet Tataria: Painting, Sculpture, Graphic Art] (in Russian). Moscow: Izobrazitelnoe Iskusstvo Publishers. p. 295.
- Chervonnaya, Svetlana Mikhailovna (1984). Художники советской Татарии (мастера изобразительного искусства Союза художников ТАССР) [Artists of Soviet Tataria (Masters of Fine Art of the Union of Artists of the Tatar ASSR)] (in Russian). Kazan: Tatar Book Publishing House. p. 462.
- Chervonnaya, Svetlana Mikhailovna (2008). "Обнажённое тело в татарском искусстве: современный художник между европейской свободой и мусульманской нравственностью" [The Nude Body in Tatar Art: The Contemporary Artist Between European Freedom and Muslim Morality]. Казань [Kazan] (in Russian) (1). Kazan: 119–136.
- Shageeva, Rozalina Gumerovna (2006). "Живописные сады Тукая" [The Painterly Gardens of Tukay]. Казань [Kazan] (in Russian) (7). Kazan: 121–136.
- Shcheglinskaya, Polina Olegovna (2020). Рецепция этнических визуальных культур в советской мозаике [The Reception of Ethnic Visual Cultures in Soviet Mosaic Art] (in Russian). Moscow: Higher School of Economics. p. 270.
- Milyausha Galiullina (2 March 2020). "Килдебәк оныгы Рөстәм" [Rustem, Grandson of Kildibek]. Mädäni Cömga' newspaper. Archived from the original on 12 October 2022.
