= Mishar Tatars =

Subgroup of the Volga Tatars

мишәрләр, мишәр татарлары, татарлар mişərlər, mişər tatarları, tatarlar
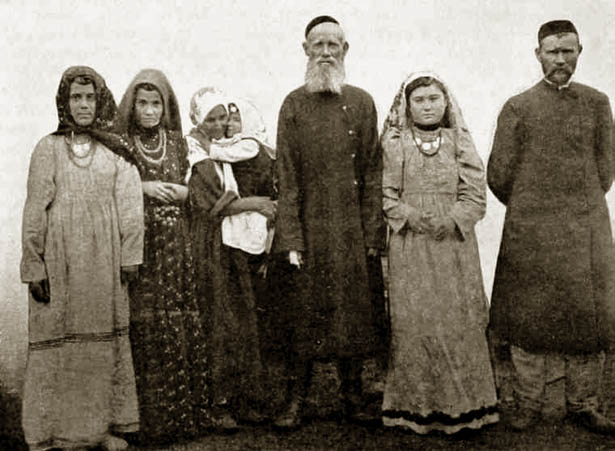
- Mishar Tatar family, late 1800s.

Total population
- approx. 2.3 million (or 1/3 of Volga Tatars)

Regions with significant populations
- Russia: 1.5–2.3 million

Languages
- Mishar dialect of Tatar, Russian

Religion
- Sunni Islam

Related ethnic groups
- Kazan Tatars, Kryashens

The Mishar Tatars (endonyms: мишәрләр, мишәр татарлары, romanized: mişärlär, mişär tatarları), previously known as the Meshcheryaks (Russian: мещеряки, romanized: meshcheryaki), are the second largest subgroup of the Volga Tatars, after the Kazan Tatars. Traditionally, they have inhabited the middle and western side of Volga, including the present day Mordovia, Tatarstan, Bashkortostan, Ryazan, Penza, Ulyanovsk, Orenburg, Nizhny Novgorod and Samara regions of Russia. Many have since relocated to Moscow. Mishars also comprise the majority of Finnish Tatars and Estonian Tatars and Tatars living in other Nordic and Baltic countries.

Mishars speak the western dialect of the Tatar language and, like the Tatar majority, practice Sunni Islam. They have at least partially different ethnogenesis from the Kazan Tatars, though many differences have since disappeared. Different accounts of their origin exist to this day, but most researchers connect their ancestors to the population of the Golden Horde. The Mishar dialect is said to be "faithfully close" to the ancient Kipchak Turkic language.

In the 1897 census, their total number was 622,600. The estimates have varied greatly since, because they are often identified simply as Tatars.

== Etymology ==
Linguist J. J. Mikkola thought the name might come from a reconstructed Mordvinic word ḿeškär, meaning "beekeeper". Its connection to proto-Hungarian Magyars has also been suggested (mazhar, mishar).

Mishars living separately from Kazan Tatars do not call themselves Mishars, they consider themselves simply Tatars. The Tatar Turkologist of the early 19th century, Akhmarov, believed that the name "Mishar" has a geographical character and originates from the historical region of Meshchera. "Mişär" most likely comes from the Kazan Tatars. Previously, in Russian sources, they were known as the Meshcheryaki (мещеряки). In the 1926 census, 200,000 called themselves "Mishars". The Tatar name originates from the time of Golden Horde, when the feudal nobility used it for its population. Later, Russian feudals and the Tsar government started using the name, though many of them still called themselves möselman ('Muslim').

In 2006, based on a single interview done in an ethnically diverse Chuvash village, the Mishars saw Islam central to their identity; they stated that Kryashens, the Christian Tatars, were not Tatars at all. They themselves identified as "Tatar", and the term Mishar only came up after repeated questioning.

== Mishars as Volga Tatars ==
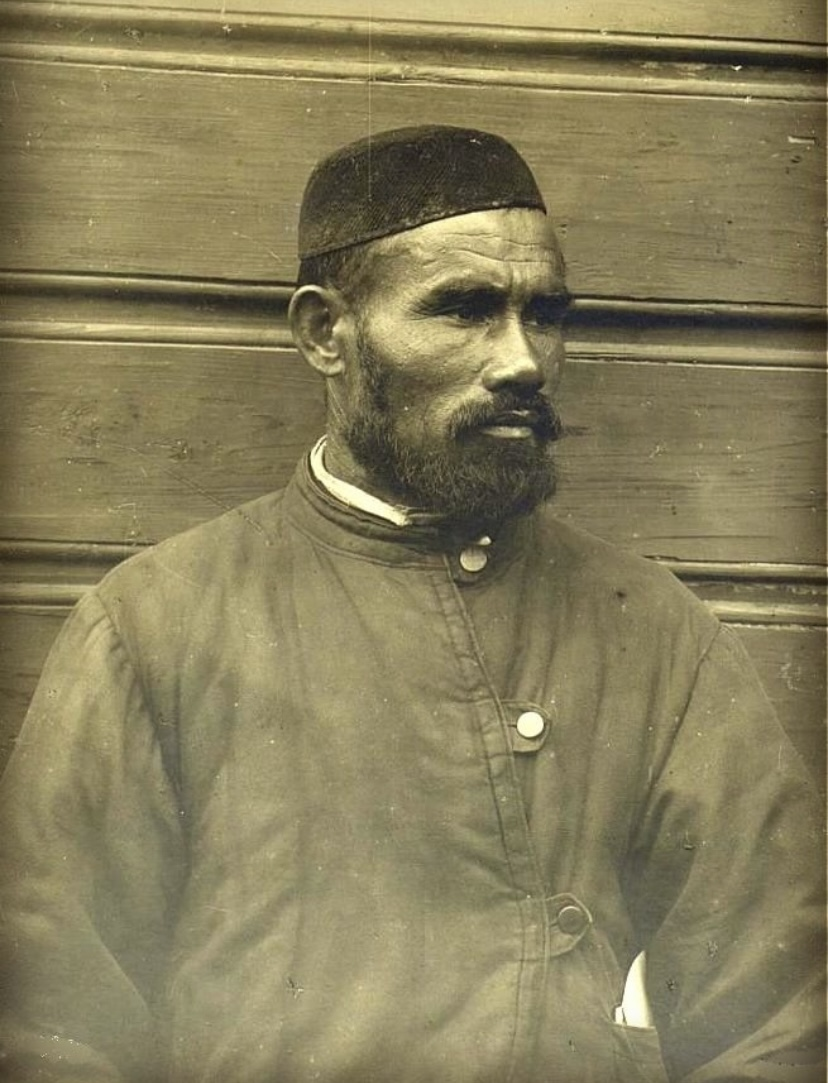
Mishar Tatar man

Mishars are the second main subgroup of Volga Tatars, the other one being the Kazan Tatars. They differ mainly in living locations and dialect, though the Mishars also have at least partially different ethnogenesis from the Kazan Tatars.

According to R. G. Mukhamedova, the Mishar Tatars are ethnic relatives of the Kazan Tatars, descendants of the Kipchaks, some of whom may be of ancient Hungarian origin. Mukhamedova presented that "the role of the Kipchaks in the formation of the Mishars was somewhat greater than in the formation of the Kazan Tatars". According to Allen J. Frank, the Mishar Tatars "have the same language and religion as the Kazan Tatars, but differ from them in their ethnic and political history". He emphasizes the Mishar's "long association with the Russian state".

Yevfimi Aleksandrovich Malov, a missionary who was active in Kazan, compared the two groups in question in his 1885 writing as follows: "The Mishar Tatars have bushier beards, they don't show off their clothes. They speak loudly, as if shouting, and add Russian expressions to their speech". A mullah named Ahsän, from the village of Yendovich interviewed by Malov, said that they came from Kasimov and differed from the Kazan Tatars in terms of language and customs.

As the Mishar and Kazan Tatars have become closer as a result of migration, the differences between them have decreased.

== History ==
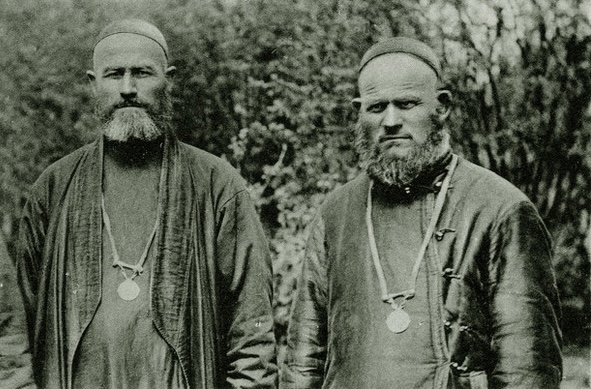
Mishar Tatars in Nizhny Novgorod Oblast, Sergachsky District.

=== Regional formation ===
The formation of the group took place in the forest-steppe zone on the west side of the Sura river, along the tributaries of the Oka. Individual nomadic groups began to move to this area inhabited by the Finnic peoples at the beginning of the 11th century. During the Golden Horde, Kipchaks moved to the region and founded e.g. Temnikov, Narovchat, Shatsky and Kadom fortresses. After the Golden Horde weakened, they became subjects of Russia, who farmed the land and paid the yasak tax or performed military service.

The ethnic character of the Mishars was mostly finally formed during 1400–1500 in Qasim Khanate, though principality of Temnikov is also named as an important factor. After migration waves from late 1500s to 1700s, they settled especially on the right bank of Volga and Urals. Increased contacts with Kazan Tatars made these two groups even closer, and thus, the "Tatar nation" was born; eventually replacing previously used regional names.

Historian Alimzhan Orlov thinks the Mishars of Nizhny Novgorod Oblast are "real Mishars". G. Akhmarov says that Mishars arrived in Novgorod in early 1600s, though some of them might have already been on the territory before; Tatars who called themselves the Meshcheryaks had settled to the deserts in the eastern part of the region already before the Invasion of Kazan (1552). In remaining texts, they recall “with great longing the happy life of their ancestors in the Kazan Khanate".

=== Ancestors ===
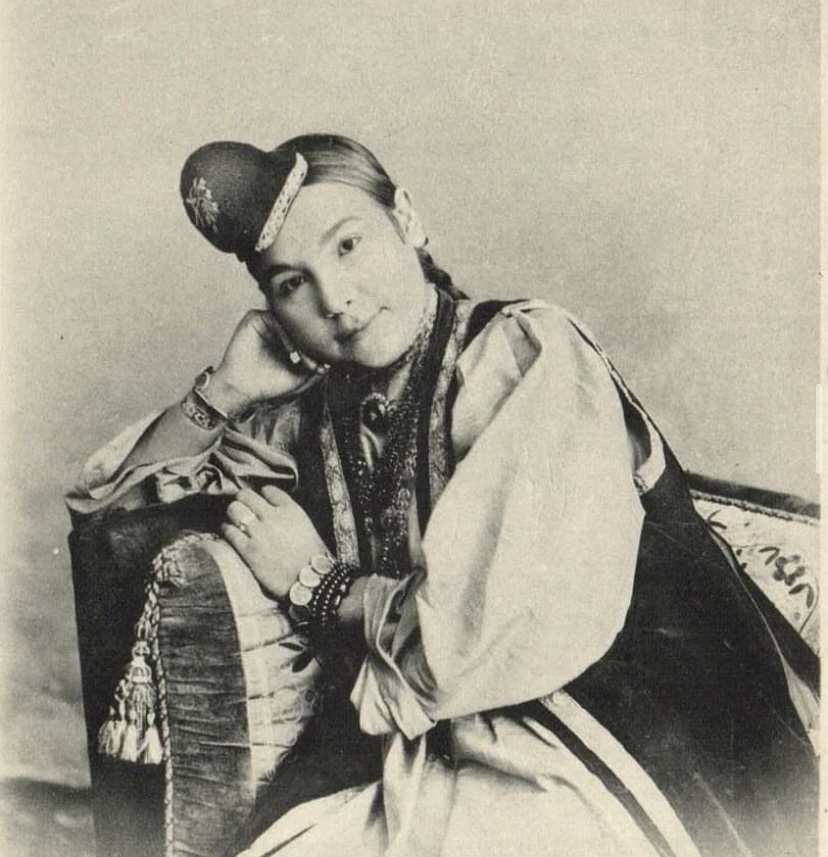
Mishar Tatar woman in Nizhny Novgorod, late 1800s.

The origin of the Mishar Tatars has remained a point of controversy for years. Generally, however, the same ancient tribes are brought up; Burtas, Bulgars, Khazars, Kipchaks / Cumans and Ugrian Magyars.

Researchers such as Velyaminov-Zernov, Radlov and Mozharovski believed that the Mishar Tatars descended from the "Tatarized" Finno-Ugric Meshchera tribe. M. Zekiyev, G. Akhmarov and A. Orlov challenge this idea. Zekiyev says: "If this theory (Meschera) turns out to be true, there must be clear traces of Finno-Ugric tribes in the Tatars, but they are not there at all." According to historian Damir Khayretdinov, genetic studies seem to also be against this theory.

The theory of A. Orlov is as follows then: The ancestors of Mishar Tatars are formed by Cumans and Meshchera. However, Orlov denies the Finnic background of the tribe. He thinks Meshchera was all along a Turkic tribe (Polovtsian), that by Ivan the Terrible, were named as Mari/Tsheremis. Orlov states, that Mishars originate from "ancient Meshchera", which is first mentioned in Golden Horde. He also proposes, that these Turkic Meshchera largely formed the Don Cossacks, also allegedly known as the "Meschera Cossacks", even before the time of Kasim Khanate. A. Gordeyev connects the formation of Cossacks to Golden Horde and Tatishev made a connection between "Meshchera Tatars" and Don Cossacks. Karamzin, according to him, wrote the following: "Cossacks are just Meschera Tatars". Orlov also states, that not all ancestors of Nizhny Novorod Mishars are from Meshchera, rather, some can be traced back to Volga Bulgaria, and others to Siberia.

The Hungarian theory exists also. Friar Julian describes Eastern Hungarians he found in Bashkiria in 1235. They spoke to him Hungarian and their language remained mutually intelligible. Some scientists of the 19th and 20th centuries, based on equivalency of the Turkic ethnonym Madjar (variants: Majgar, Mojar, Mishar, Mochar) with the Hungarian self-name Magyar, associated them with Hungarian speaking Magyars and came to a conclusion that Turkic-speaking Mishars were formed by a Turkization of those Hungarians who remained in the region after their main part left to the West in the 8th century. The shift magyar>mozhar is natural for Hungarian phonology and this form of the ethnonym was in use until they shifted to Tatar in 15-16th centuries. The existence of the ethnic toponyms mozhar, madjar to the east of Carpathian region proves this. The presence of early medieval Hungarian culture is attested by archeological findings in Volga-Ural region. The influence of Hungarian language resulted in forming definite conjugation in Mordvinic languages which is found only in Ugric languages. Medieval Hungarian loans are found in Volga Bulgarian and Mordvinic languages. Ethnologist R.G. Kuzeyev says that the Mishars by their origin "go back to one of the ancient Ugric tribes of the Magyar union", and this ethnonym itself "has a Ugric-Magyar basis".

The ancestors of Mishar Tatars being part of Golden Horde, one way or another, unifies researchers. UCLA Center for Near East Studies states that Mishars most likely descent from the Kipchaks of Golden Horde, that settled on the West side of the Volga. Khayretdinov: "The Meshchersky yurt was considered an integral part of the Golden Horde, and not only in its capital Sarai, but also in Crimea and elsewhere". Radlov noted that the Mishar-Tatar dialect is one of the closest to the Cuman language used in Codex Cumanicus. Leitzinger called their dialect "faithfully close" to ancient Kipchak.

== Culture ==
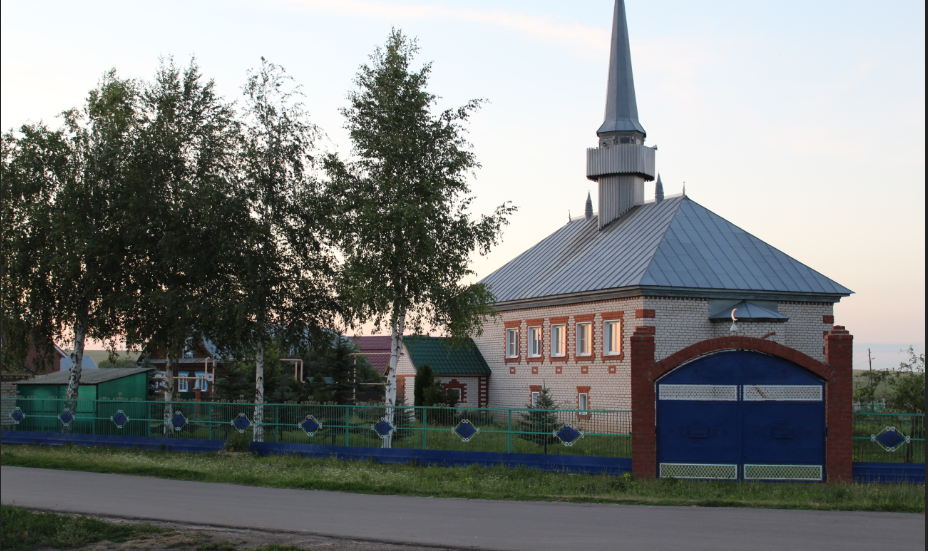
Mosque in Mishar Tatar village Çümbäli.

Like the Tatar majority, Mishars also are Sunni Muslim.

The Mishars speak the western dialect of the Tatar language. (The Mishar Dialect). It is further divided into several local dialects. The Western dialect is characterized by the absence of the labialized [ɒ] and the uvular [q] and [ʁ] found in the Middle Tatar dialect. In some local dialects there is an affricate [tʃ], in others [ts]. The written Tatar language (i.e., the Kazan dialect) has been formed as a result of the mixing of central and western dialects. The Mishar dialect, especially in the Sergach area, has been said to be very similar to the ancient Kipchak languages. Some linguists (Radlov, Samoylovich) think that Mishar Tatar belongs to the Kipchak-Cuman group rather than to the Kipchak-Bulgar group. Khayretdinov: "The Mishar dialect is incomparably closer to the Kipchak language than other languages of the Kipchak subgroup in many phonetic and especially morphological features".

Material from the second half of the 18th century on the Mishar dialect shows references to the Kasimov dialect, which has since disappeared, and especially to the Kadom area. Russian loanwords also appear.

G. N. Akhmarov noticed a similarity in the Mishar and Kazakh cultures in the national dress of women and in the ancient Kipchak words, which are not found in the Kazan Tatar dialect, but are in the center for the Kazakhs, as well as Siberian Tatars and Altai people.

Russian and Mordvian influences have been observed in Mishar architecture, house construction and home decoration. Mishar tales often contain signs of paganism and a lot of animal motifs. Social satire has also been popular. It usually targetes the rich and spiritual leaders. Folk poetry is wistful, about the home region and miserable human fates. The wedding songs of the Mishar people are very similar to the songs of the Chuvash. According to Orlov, the Mishars resemble the Karaites and the Balkars because of their language, traditional food, and the naming of the days of the week. A. Samoylovich writes; "The individual name system of the days of the week is observed in a wide area, from the Meshcheryaks of the Sergach region of Nizhny Novgorod province to the Turks of Anatolia and the Balkan Peninsula."

Even though the Mishars present many different ethnic traits, they are (like Balkars) said to be one of the "purest representatives" of ancient Kipchaks today. Orlov states: "Nizhny Novogord Tatars are one of the original Tatar groups, who maintain the continuity of Kipchak-Turkic language, culture and tradition."

A. Leitzinger thinks Mishars have more Kipchak in their dialect, where as Bolgar influence possibly is found better among the Kazan Tatars.

== Genetics ==
A genetic analysis found that the medieval Hungarian Conqueror elite is closely related to Turkic groups in the Volga region, notably Volga Tatars and Bashkirs, which, according to the study, can be modeled as ~50% Mansi-like, ~35% Sarmatian-like, and ~15% Hun/Xiongnu-like. The admixture event is suggested to have taken place in the Southern Ural region at 643–431 BCE, which is "in agreement with contemporary historical accounts which denominated the Conquerors as Turks".

=== Y-DNA ===
The most common are haplogroups J2 (26.38%) and R1a (22.7%), foollowed by N (12.85%) and R1b (9.17%).

Haplogroups	Frequency
All samples	436
С2	1.61%
E1b	7.57%
G1	0.46%
G2a	2.75%
I1	2.52%
I2	1.61%
J1	0.92%
J2a	7.11%
J2b	19.27%
L1	2.75%
N1a1	0.69%
N1a1-Y9022	2.52%
N1a1-M2019	1.61%
N1a1-L1022	0.23%
N1a1-L550	4.59%
N1a1-Z1936>Z1934	0.69%
N1a2-VL67	0.23%
N1a2-Y3185	2.29%
O	1.83%
Q1b	4.13%
R1a	2.29%
R1a-M458	3.67%
R1a-CTS1211	8.03%
R1a-Z92	2.06%
R1a-Z93	6.65%
R1b-M478	3.21%
R1b-L51	3.90%
R1b-Z2103	2.06%
T	1.15%

== Physical anthropology ==
According to T. A. Trofimova, Mishar Tatars in Chistopolsky District belong to following 4 phenotypes: Pontid 61.1%, light Caucasoid 19.4%, Mongoloid of South Siberian type 11.1%, and Sublaponoid of Volga-Kama type 8.3%. For a comparison, Kazan Tatars, also in the Chistopolsky District, belong to the following phenotypes: 44.4% Pontid, 25% Mongoloid of South Siberian type, 16.7% light Caucasoid and 13.9% Sublaponoid of Volga-Kama type.

Khayretdinov brings up the possible Iranian-Burtas theory when discussing the dark appearance of Mishar Tatars. N.D. Rusinov suggested that some hydronyms in the southern and southeastern parts of the Nizhny Novgorod region may be of Iranian origin.

== Mishars and Russians ==
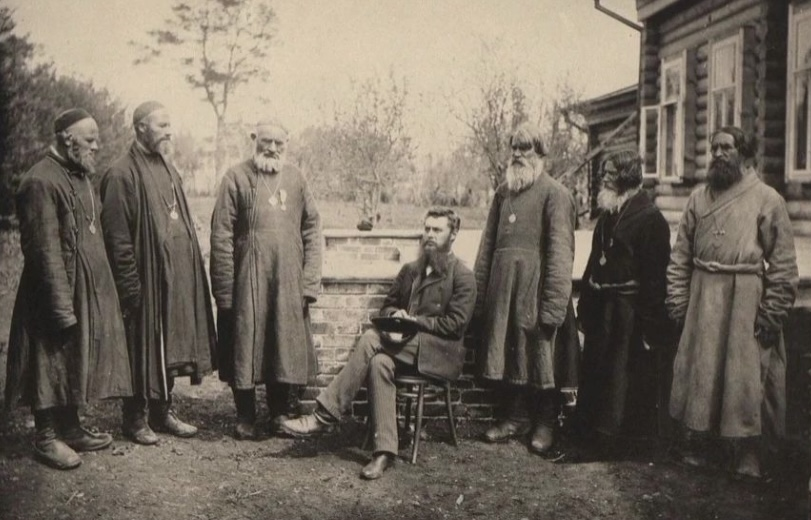
Land Captain of the second section of Sergachsky District P. V. Dmitriev (in the middle) with his subordinates; Mishar Tatars on left, Russians on right. (late 1800s).

According to Leitzinger, Mishars are traditionally maybe slightly more "symphatetic" to Russians than Kazan Tatars. These two groups have lived next to each other and therefore the Mishars have been influenced by them. Due to this, the Kazan Tatars have thought, maybe condescendingly, that Mishars are "half Russian". Mishars are not however the so called "Russified Tatars", but still maintain their Kipchak-Turkic language and Sunni Islamic faith.

Mishars are known to have partaken in the Cossack army of Stenka Razin during the 1670–1671 uprising, and probably also in other revolutions in Russian Empire. In 1798–1865, they formed the "Bashkir-Meshcheryaki Army" (Башкиро-мещерякское войско), which was an irregural formation, but took part for example in the French invasion of Russia (1812).

Orlov says that "Meshchera Tatars" were in the Cossack army of Russian conquest of Siberia. Orlov has also given a simple statement relating to this: "The ancestors of Mishars are the Don Cossacks".

In some sources, Mishars are known as "Kasimov Tatars", since they were formed there. However, the formation, also known as Qasıym Tatars, was eventually a separate Tatar group; according to S. Ishkhakov, an "ethnically transitional group between Kazan Tatars and Mishar Tatars". Kasimov Tatars took part in the conquest of Kazan and in wars against Sweden with Ivan the Terrible.

In 1400–1500s, the Tatars of Kasim Khanate operated as representatives and translators in Russian court.

== Population ==
Since World War II, estimates of the number of Mishars have varied between 300,000 and 2,000,000. The census has been complicated by them sometimes being counted as their own group (Mishar/Mescheryaki) and sometimes as Tatars in general. Merging with the people of Kazan has also contributed to the matter. In 1926 census, there were 200 000 Mishars, but the number was thought to be higher in reality, because not everyone identified as Mishar. In 1897, the number of "Mishars" had been 622,600.

Traditionally, the Mishars have inhabited the western side of the Volga River. Majority of the Nizhny Novgorod Mishars currently live in Moscow.

== Notable Mishar Tatars ==
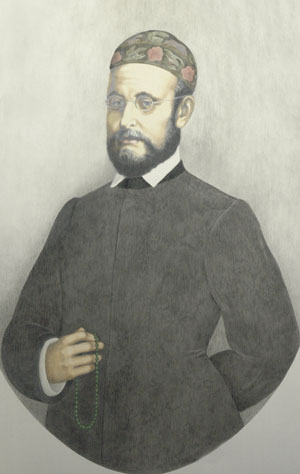
Husain Faizkhanov (1823–1866), a Mishar Tatar historian, philologist and teacher.

- Ayaz İshaki (1878–1954) - leading figure of the Tatar national movement
- Ali Abderazakov (1912–1992) - World War II hero
- Hamzya Bogdanov (1904–1983) - World War II hero
- Shamil Tarpishchev (b. 1948) - tennis coach
- Ruslan Chagaev (b. 1978) - boxer
- Ilmir Hazetdinov (b. 1991) - ski jumper
- Sadek Abdulzhalilov (1829–1886) – sheikh, ulama, philosopher
- Bedretdin Alimov (1870–1937) – first imam of Moscow Cathedral Mosque
- Marat Basharov (b. 1974) – actor
- Khaydar Bigichev (1949–1998) – singer
- Diniyar Bilyaletdinov (b. 1985) – footballer
- Zinetula Bilyaletdinov (b. 1955) – ice hockey player, coach
- Husain Faizkhanov (1823–1866) – historian, philologist
- Lotfulla Fattakhov (1918–1981) – painter
- Rifat Fattakhov (b. 1966) – journalist, cultural worker
- Marat Izmailov (b. 1982) – footballer
- Aliya Mustafina (b. 1994) – artistic gymnast (Tatar father)
- Alimzhan Orlov (b. 1929) – historian
- Marat Safin (b. 1980) – tennis player
- Abdulvakhid Suleymanov (1786–1862) – third mufti of Orenburg Muslim Spiritual Assembly
- Rashid Vagapov (1908–1962) – singer
- Mukhammed-Zarif Yunusov (1850–1914) – imam of the first Muslim congregation of Saint Petersburg
- Rinat Akhmetov (b. 1966) - businessman

== Finnish Mishars ==
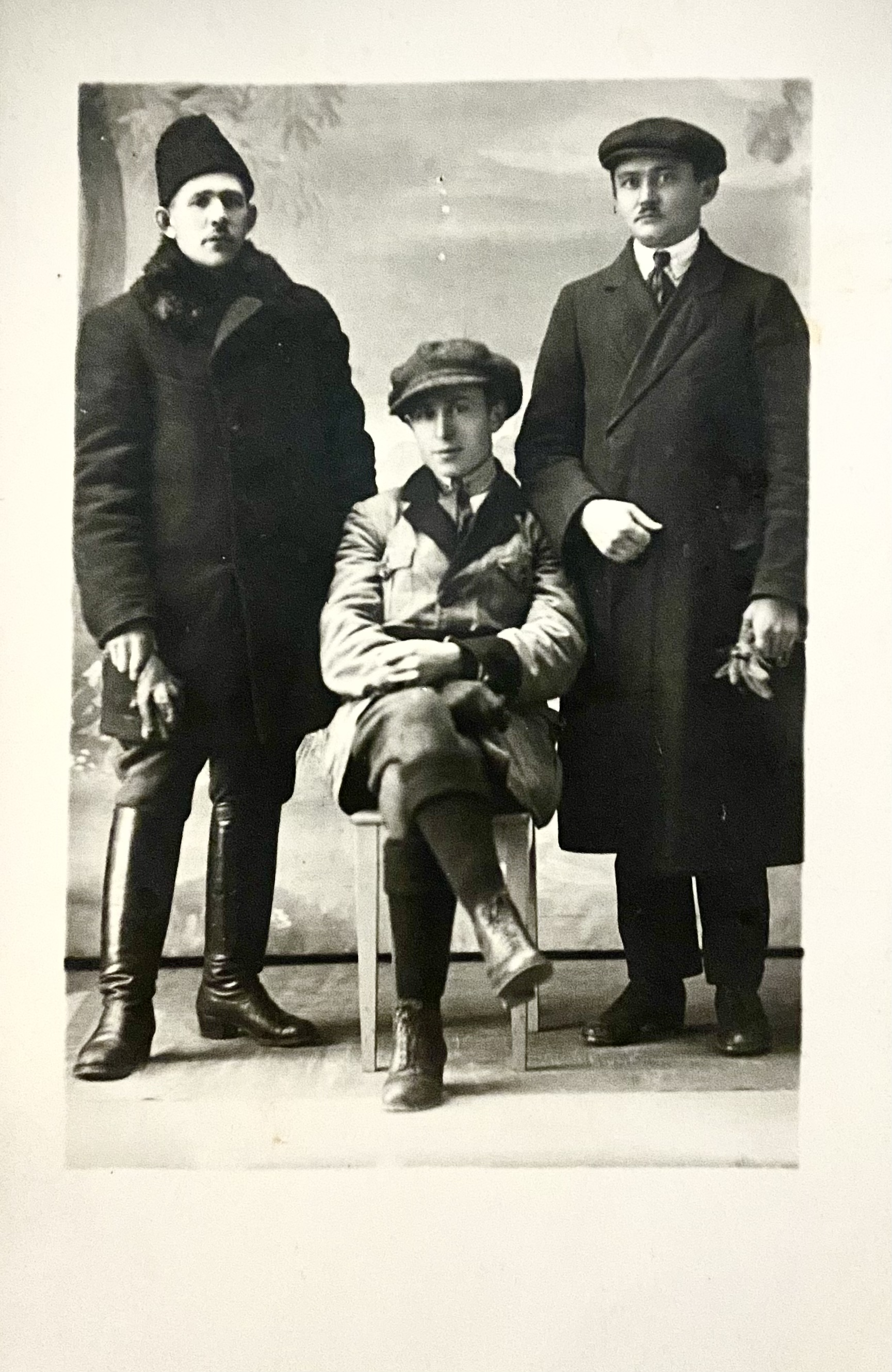
Minhacetdin Bedretdin, Aisa Hakimcan and Ibrahim Teregul; Mishar Tatars from Nizhny Novgorod, pictured in Finland, year 1920.

The Tatars in Finland are Mishar Tatars, whose ancestors came from the villages of Nizhny Novgorod Oblast. A nickname for such Mishars is "Nizhgar" / Nizhgarlar" (Нижгар / Нижгарлар).

A project focused on Nizhny Novgorod Mishars, which historian Alimzhan Orlov calls "the pure Mishars", is tatargenealogy.ru, created by Ruslan Akmetdinov.

== See also ==
- Eastern Hungarians
- Friar Julian
- Aktuk

== Literature ==
- Leitzinger, Antero: Mishäärit – Suomen vanha islamilainen yhteisö. (Sisältää Hasan Hamidullan ”Yañaparin historian”. Suomentanut ja kommentoinut Fazile Nasretdin). Helsinki: Kirja-Leitzinger, 1996. ISBN 952-9752-08-3.
- Орлов, Алимжан Мустафинович: Нижегородские татары: этнические корни и исторические судьбы. Н. Новгород : Изд-во Нижегор. ун-та, 2001. ISBN 5-8746-407-8, OCLC 54625854 (Archived online version)
