= Hasan Kanykoff =

- Hasan Kanuk
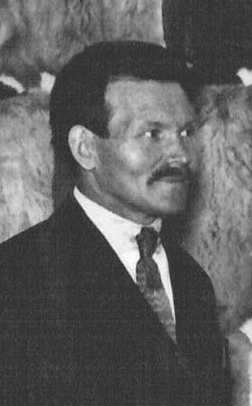
- Kanykoff at a fair selling furs.
- Born: February 27, 1880; Aktuk, Sergachsky Uyezd, Nizhny Novgorod Governorate, Russian Empire
- Died: May 3, 1954 (aged 74); Järvenpää, Finland
- Other name: Hasän Kanuk
- Spouse(s): 1; Haditshä Ainetdin, 2; Zölihä Mangushoff
- Children: Halisä, Djagfär, Hamzä, Hafisä, Feyezrahman, Ädhäm
- Relatives: novelist Sabira Ståhlberg (grandchild)

Hasan Kanykoff (né Kanuk; February 27, 1880 – May 3, 1954) was a Tatar political activist in Finland. He also worked as a merchant and among his community was known as a kind of leading figure who helped fellow Tatar tradesmen get used to business in their new environment. Kanykoff himself moved to Finland in late 1800s.

== Life ==
Hasan Kanykoff (Kanuk), son of Hairetdin, was born on February 27, 1880. He was from Nizhny Novgorod Governorate - a Tatar village named Aktuk. Kanykoff came to Finland in 1895. He's known to have lived at least in Helsinki, Tampere, Hämeenlinna, and for a while in Sweden.

Kanykoff, like other Tatars of his generation operated as a merchant. Among his fellow tradesmen, he had a kind of leader's position; he demanded everyone to get an official licence for their business on Finnish soil. In settling into the country, they also got help from some local university people, who for example helped them with the language and explained them the political situation during the times of Russification of Finland. One of these people was a linguist named Heikki Paasonen, who had traveled to Aktuk in late 1800s and collected information on the Mishar Tatars.

Kanykoff, with another Tatar activist Sarif Daher (1884-1959) and some Finnish like minded people established an association called Etuvartiokansojen klubi in fall 1919. It operated until 1928 and its purpose was to establish co-operation between the minorities in Russia and the then-new states that had separated from Russia. Before this, Kanykoff had friended linguist G.J. Ramstedt and professor Yrjö Jahnsson, who were interested in the pursuits for independence of Tatars. Jahnsson helped Kanykoff acquire Finnish citizenship in 1921. He also helped get the children of Kanykoff into the country. The first wife of Hasan Kanykoff was Haditshä Ainetdin, who died in 1917. The second was Zölihä Mangushoff. Kanykoff had children Halisä, Djagfär, Hamzä, Hafisä, Feyezrahman, Ädhäm. His older brother was Silaletdin (1866-1930). Daughter Hafisä died as a child during an epidemic. One of the sons, Feyez, was killed while serving during the Winter War. Two of them served in the Winter War and the Continuation War as lieutenants. The boys wanted to get rid of the Russian suffix (-off) but couldn't come to an agreement on what the name should be, so they came up with: Kayenuk / Kajenuk, Kanukhan. The background of the surname is uncertain.

The writer Sabira Ståhlberg is Kanykoff's granddaughter. She has published Tatar language literature on Aybagar.eu.

Hasan Kanykoff died May 3, 1954, in Järvenpää.
