= Räshid Nasretdin =

Finnish photographer

Räshid Nasretdin Рәшит Насретдин
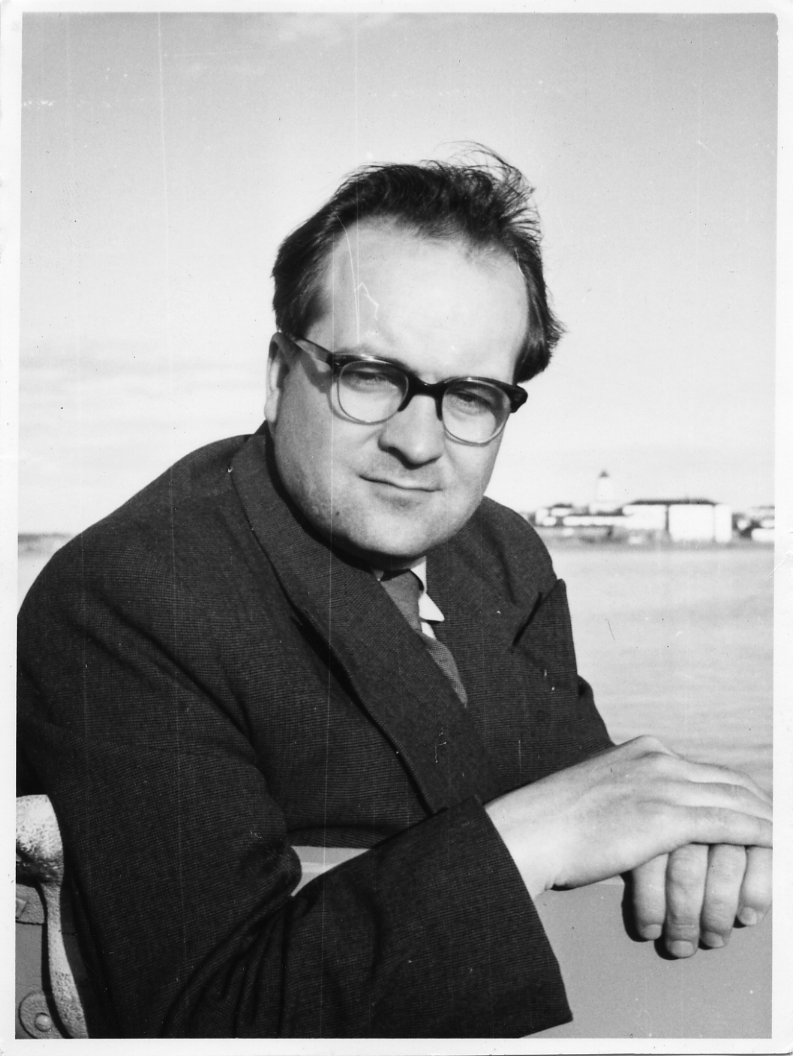
- Nasretdin in 1950s.
- Born: Abdul-Räshid Nasretdin (Nasretdinov); 14 July 1920; Aktuk, Sergachsky Uyezd, Nizhny Novgorod Governorate, Russian SFSR
- Died: 28 August 2010 (aged 90); Helsinki, Finland
- Occupations: Photographer, entrepreneur
- Spouse: Habibä Sadik

Räshid Nasretdin (born Abdul-Räshid, Tatar: Рәшит (Габдеррәшит) Насретдин; 14 July 1920 – 28 August 2010) was a Finnish photographer of Tatar descent, who operated his own shop in Helsinki for decades with his wife. Among the people he captured include notable politicians and artists. Nasretdin moved to Finland from Russia as a child.

== Biography ==
Abdul-Räshid (later Räshid) Nasretdin was born as the son of Fähretdin Nasretdinoff in a Nizhny Novgorod Governorate village named Aktuk. He came to Finland when he was two years old and at first lived in Lappeenranta and after that in Helsinki. He studied to become a housebuilder but through his classmate he eventually became interested in photography.

In 1945, Nasretdin married. With his wife Habibä Sadik he operated a photography shop in Helsinki for over forty years. Their other son, Samil, has continued with the shop since, located in Fredrikinkatu.

Nasretdin's work was versatile. He photographed sports events, daily life and notable figures, both Finnish and foreign. Local people who Nasretdin photographed include for example presidents Kaarlo Juho Ståhlberg and Urho Kekkonen, architect Alvar Aalto, sculptor Wäinö Aaltonen and actor Tauno Palo. Wide variety of international guests include Prince Tsuneyoshi, Princess Sibylla, politician Nikolai Bulganin, actor Gregory Peck and Kazan Tatar composer Röstäm Yäxin.

Nasretdin was an active member in different photography clubs and unions. He was awarded an artist's pension in 1987 and also other accolades. During his later years, after retiring from his profession, Nasretdin spent his days boating and fishing at his house in Dalsbruk. Nasretdin treated his sick wife for her final years. Nasretdin himself died at the age of 90 in Myllypuro, Helsinki.
