= Hasan Hamidulla =

- حسن حميد الله
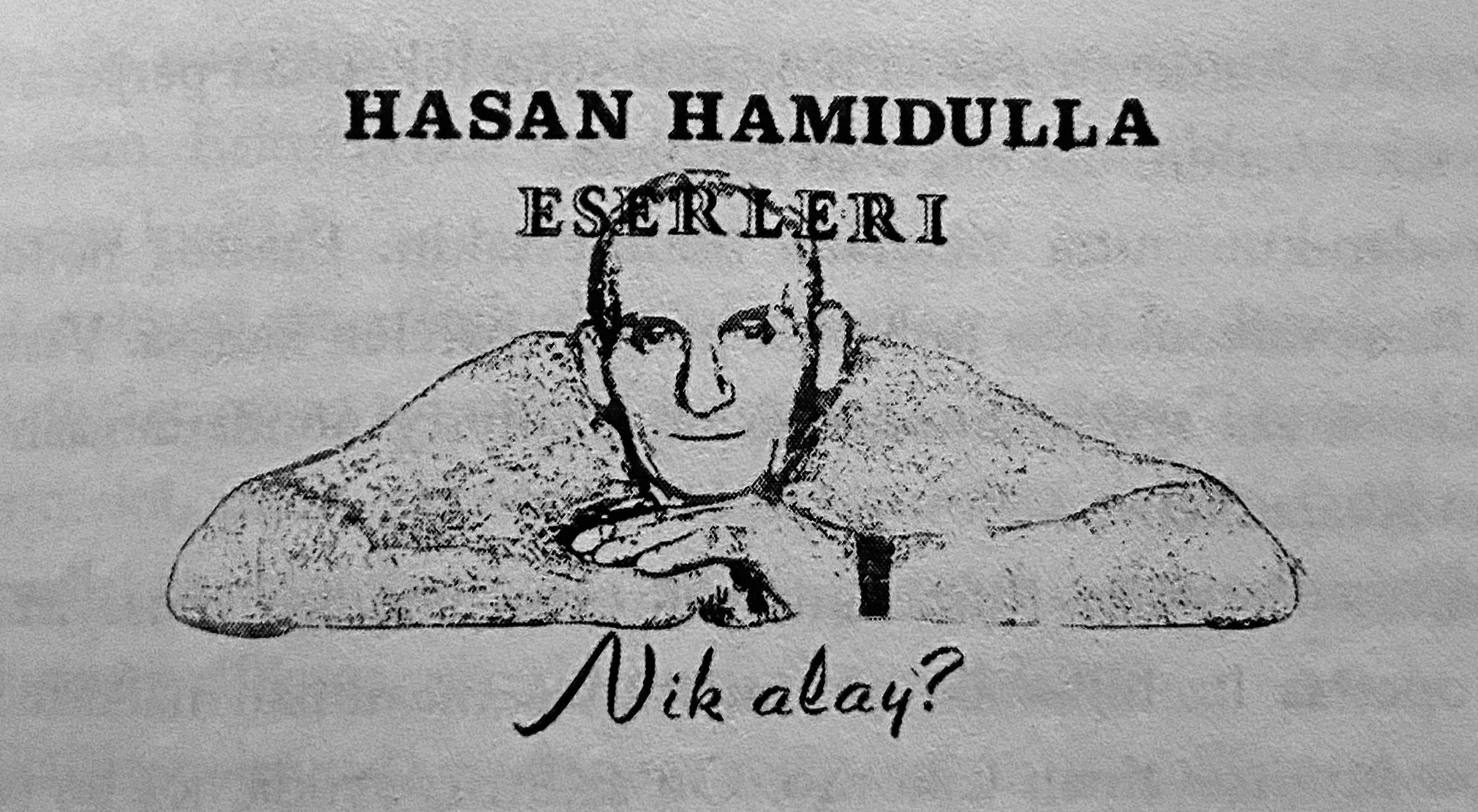
- Publication ”Nik alay?” from 1960s.
- Born: 25 November 1895 or 1900; Aktuk, Sergachsky Uyezd, Nizhny Novgorod Governorate, Russian Empire
- Died: 6 October 1988; Finland
- Resting place: Helsinki Islamic Cemetery
- Other names: Hamidullen, Kulik
- Spouse: Gülsüm
- Children: Tahire, Ymär
- Parent(s): Nisametdin, Bedrihayet
- Honours: Hajji

Hajji Hasan Hamidulla (né Hamidullen: Russian: Хамидуллин, Hamidullin - Tatar: Хәсән Хәмидулла – also known by the ancestral name Kulik; 25 November 1895/1900 – 6 October 1988) was a Tatar writer, publisher, entrepreneur and shopkeeper in Finland. Hamidulla was among the most active writers and publishers of his community. His work consists of histories, religious texts and also for example prose text such as poetry and plays. Hamidulla had his own printing press and he distributed his work for free. For decades, Hamidulla operated an electronics shop he had established.

In 2026, one of Hamidulla’s notable works, Yañapar tarihı – a historic on his home village – was translated to English by Sabira Stahlberg and Fazile Nasretdin.

== Biography ==
Hasan Nizameddin uğlı Hamidulla (Hamidullin) was born in the Russian Empire, Nizhny Novgorod Governorate - a village named Aktuk. He moved to the then-Grand Duchy of Finland in 1915 with his merchant father Nisametdin. His grandfather had already been staying on the territory since 1860s and was among the first Tatars in the country.

The Hamidulla family stayed at Terijoki (Zelenogorsk) until 1923, after which they moved to Oulu and then Kemi, where Hamidulla himself made a living as a merchant. Hamidulla lived in Turkey during 1926–1927, where he served his military service.

Back in Finland, Hamidulla was operating an electronics and radioshop in Kemi, which during the Continuation War also fixed the electric devices, batteries and outboard motors of both the Finnish and German armies. From 1950 forward, Hamidulla lived in Helsinki, where he continued shopkeeping with his shop Tehowatti, which was located at Pieni Roobertinkatu. He retired only a few years before his death in 1980s.

In addition to Tatar, Hamidulla spoke Arabic, Russian, Turkish, Finnish and Swedish. He started his publishing career with the 12-part magazine called Mägrifät (1925). It was eventually banned by local authorities however, due to them being unable to guard the material which was in foreign language.

Hamidulla did his wide publishing work from his own printing press. The books and pamphlets were mostly histories, memoirs, religious texts and prose text such as poetry and some plays. One of the more well known works of Hamidulla among the community is the history of his home village, Aktuk (Yañapar tārīhi, 1954), which has also been translated into Finnish. In 1943, Hamidulla did a 20 000 print facsimile of Arabic language Quran which was originally published in Kazan. It was then distributed to the Islamic prisoners of war in Finland and Germany. Hamidulla continued his active publishing work until late 1970s. His publications are mostly written in the old Arabic alphabet of Tatar language, but some also in the Latin script. It is known that Hamidulla also wrote in some Finnish magazines and as a young man, he had been a reporter in a Saint Petersburg based newspaper.

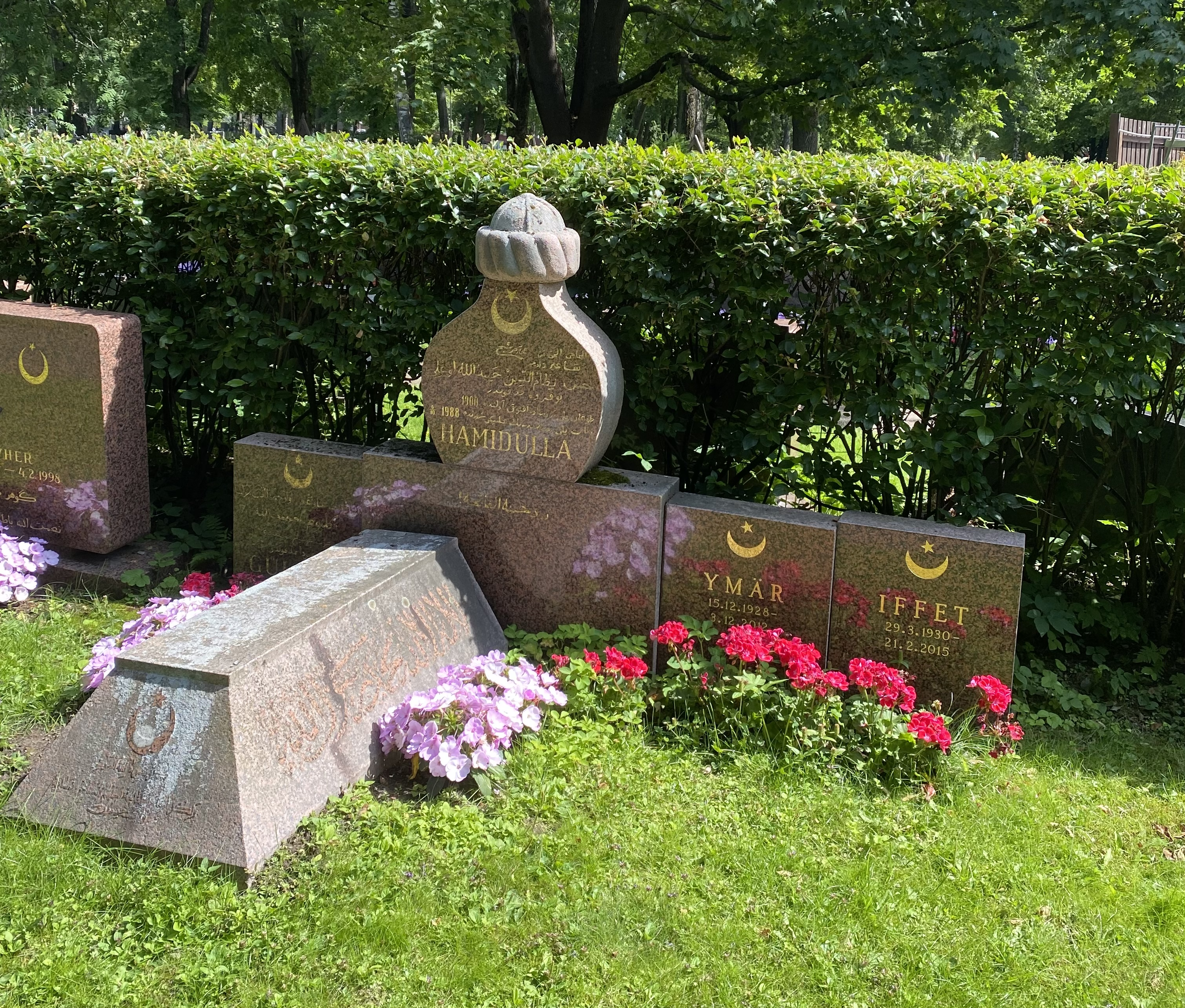
Grave of Hamidulla and his family members in Helsinki.

During his life, Hamidulla did a pilgrimage to Mecca twice. He was also a contributor among the local Tatar congregation.

== Literary work ==
=== History, memoirs, biographies etc. ===
- Yañapar tarïhï : Aktukin kylän historia : 1667–1919 (Helsinki, 1954).
- Nik alay? Yazuçïnïn üz tärğümä-i ḥālendän 1-7. Finlandiyä möselmanlarïnïn tāriḫ materiallarï / Miksi niin? Kirjoittajan oma elämänkerrasta osat 1-7. Aineksia Suomen muslimien historiaan. (Helsinki 1962–1977).
- Ḥāğğ ḥāṭiräläre / Hac hatırelerı / Pyhänmaan muistoja 1-2 (Helsinki 1968–1971).
- Baṣïlmïyča qalganlar / Basılmıçe kalganlar ("Painamatta jääneitä").
- Ḥasan Niẓāmeddīn Ḥamīdullāh äsärläre / teokset 1-5.
- İsem könläre kalindarï / Isım könläre kalendarı / Musulmaanien nimipäiväkalenteri (Kemi 1948).
- Finlandiyä möselmānlarïnïñ telefon kataloġï / Telefon katalogı / Suomen musulmanien puhelinluettelo (1971-1972, 1974, 1977, 1980).
- Tellär tārīhï / Teller tarıhı / Kielten yleistä historiaa. Hamidullan uusintapainos Kazanissa 1909 ilmestyneestä vihkosesta (Helsinki 1960).

=== Magazines ===
- Mä'rifät / Mägrifät ("Valistus") 1 - 12 (Kemi 1925)
- Šimāl očqonlarï / Šimāl ocqonlarï / Şimal oçkunları / Revontulet 1945 -1977. Kahdeksan numeroa, ensin Kemissä (1-2) ja sitten Helsingissä.

=== Stories ===
- Yoldozlarġa säyāḥat / Yulduzlarga seyehat / Retki tähtiin (Kemi 1947).
- Täqdīr qaršïnda. Berenče dönya ṣuġïšï vāqï`alarïndan. / Tekdir karşında / Tuomion edessä. Kertomus ensimmäisen maalmansodan ajoilta (Helsinki 1950).
- Möhāğïr bäḥete (Mohacır behıtı / Pakolaisen onni (Helsinki 1953).

Poetry, plays, proverbs

- Ḥayrülnisā / Haırünnisa (Kemi 1943).
- İlhām yimešläre / Ilham yımışlerı / Lahjan hedelmät 1 - 9 (1925-1945) - ilmestyivät Helsingissä 1969-1970.
- Tormoš moñlarï. Ši'ir / Tormuş moñları. Șıyirlar ("Elämän murheet. Runoja") Helsinki 1973.
- Vaẓï'yät ečendä / Vaziyet içinde. Şiyırlar. ("Tilanteen mukaan. Runoja") Helsinki 1973.
- Yöräk ärnüläre. Ši'irlar / Yörek Ernülerı ("Sydän suruja") Helsinki 1980.
- Borongï kartlar süze / Burungı kartlar / babaylar süzı / Vanhoja sanaparsia. Helsinki 1951, 1977.
- Tatar halïq ğïrlarï häm moňlarï 1 / Tatar halik moňları 1 ("Tataarien kansan lauluja ja sävelmiä 1") Helsinki 1975.
- Özölgän ömid / Özülgen ömid / Katkennut unelma on 5-näytöksinen draama. Helsinki 1960.
- Behitsizlär ("Onnettomat") Helsinki 1973.
- Mökter babay ("Mökter pappa") Helsinki 1973.
- Qaraq / Karak ("Varas") Helsinki 1974.
- Aldïm birdem / Aldïm birdım ("Avioliittosopimus") Helsinki 1976.

=== Religious texts ===
- Kälām-i šärif: Qur'ān-i kärīm / Kur'ani Kerim (Kemi 1943, toinen versio Helsinki 1969).
- Täfsīr-i No'mānī ("Nu'mānin kommentaari") Helsinki 1958.
- Yaña īmān šartï häm belemleklär / Yaña iman şartı hem blımkler / Uskonnon ehdot - İsm-i e'aẓam / İsmü eazam ("Ylevin nimi") Helsinki 1955, 1968.
- Vaq sürälär häm do'ālar / Uak Süreler hem Doalar / Rukouksia. Ğom'a ḫoṭbalarï 1 / Cuma hotbaları 1 / Perjantaisaarnoja (Helsinki 1973).
- Vä'azlar - ḫoṭbalar. Ğom'a ḫoṭbalarïnïñ dävāmï / Veazlar Hotbalar. Cuma hotbalarının 2 - 6 (Helsinki 1974).
- Yāsīn-i šärif / Yasın / 36:s Süre (Koran) ("YS", Koraanin 36. suura) Helsinki 1966.
- Yāsīn-i šärif / Yasın şerif (Helsinki 1975).
- Namaz ("Rukous") Helsinki 1973.
- Täübä do'āsï / Tevbe doası ("Katumusrukous") Helsinki 1975.
- Latinča döröst uqur öčön namāz süräläre / Latinča döröst ukïr öçön Namaz syreler (Ramazan ayï ḥörmätenä / "Ramazan kuun kunniaksi") Helsinki 1976.
- Täbärek. El-mülk süräse / Tebarek. Kor'an: Elmük sürese ("Surat al-mulk. Valtiuden suura") Helsinki 1978.

== Sources ==
- Bedretdin, Kadriye: Hasan Hamidulla - Tataarikirjailijan elämä : nik alay?. Suomen Itämainen Seura, Helsinki 2021. ISBN 978-951-9380-92-8
- Bedretdin, Kadriye: Tugan Tel - Kirjoituksia Suomen tataareista. Suomen Itämainen Seura, Helsinki 2011. ISBN 978-951-9380-78-0
- Leitzinger, Antero: Mishäärit - Suomen vanha islamilainen yhteisö. Kirja-Leitzinger, Helsinki 1996. ISBN 952-9752-08-3
