= Alimjan Idris =

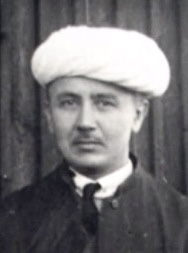
- Born: Alimdzhan Dzhagfarov; 1887; Petropavl, Kazakhstan, Russian Empire
- Died: 1959 (aged 71–72); Saudi Arabia
- Resting place: Munich, Germany
- Spouse: Shamsebanat
- Children: Orhan, Ildar, Gulnar
- Father: Jafar (Dzhagfar, Cəğfər)
- Relatives: Janette Sadik-Khan (grandchild)

Alimjan Idris (Russian: Алимджан Идрис, romanized: Alimdzhan, Tatar: Гaлимҗaн Идрис, Ğalimcan İdris; 1887–1959) was a Tatar Islamic theologian, imam, teacher and reporter. He was born in Russian Empire and throughout his life traveled vastly around the world. In Germany during World War I, he was an important figure among the Muslim prisoners at war camps where he operated as a kind of spiritual leader and assisted them in various ways. For his later affiliation with the Nazi government, Idris has been compared to Amin al-Husseini. According to historian David Motadel, "no person shaped the history of Islam in early twentieth-century Germany more than Idris". During the 1920s, for a while, Idris became a part of the Finnish Tatar community, where he was known as a demanding teacher and a Pan Turkic figure.

== Biography ==
Alimjan, son of Jafar (Dzhagfar), was born in Petropavl, Kazakhstan, during the reign of Russian Empire. His parents were from Tatarstan: Father from Kazan, mother from Buinsk. During the years 1902–1907, Idris studied at a high grade Madrasa in Bukhara. After that, he continued to study theology and philosophy in Istanbul. Later, Idris worked at the Teacher's Institute in Orenburg. In 1912, he again supplemented his knowledge by studying in Europe, for example at the University of Lausanne.

When World War I began, Idris traveled back to Istanbul, where he worked as a reporter at the Pan-Turkic magazine Türk Yurdu

Until late 1915, Idris operated as imam in Eger. Then, he started his services for the Muslim prisoners at the Weinberg war camp in Wünsdorf. The camp was originally created for Muslim prisoners who originated from Russia. The prisoners numbered approximately 12 000 and they were mostly Volga Tatars and Bashkirs. The apparent good conditions of the prisoners served as propaganda for the German government. For the prisoners of Islamic faith, there was a separate cemetery at Zahrensdorf, called Efrenfriedhof, where approximately 400 Tatars were buried. In the city, there was also a war camp called Halbmondlager.

During his time at the camp, Idris was a reporter of multiple magazines that were distributed to the prisoners. He also helped the prisoners in various ways; for example, he organized returns to home for them, or the possibility to emigrate to Turkey, and an opportunity to learn German. Idris as well helped some prisoners abroad, like fellow teacher Gibadulla Murtasin, who was captured during the war and transferred to Denmark. Idris was able to bring him and other prisoners to Germany where he could help them better.

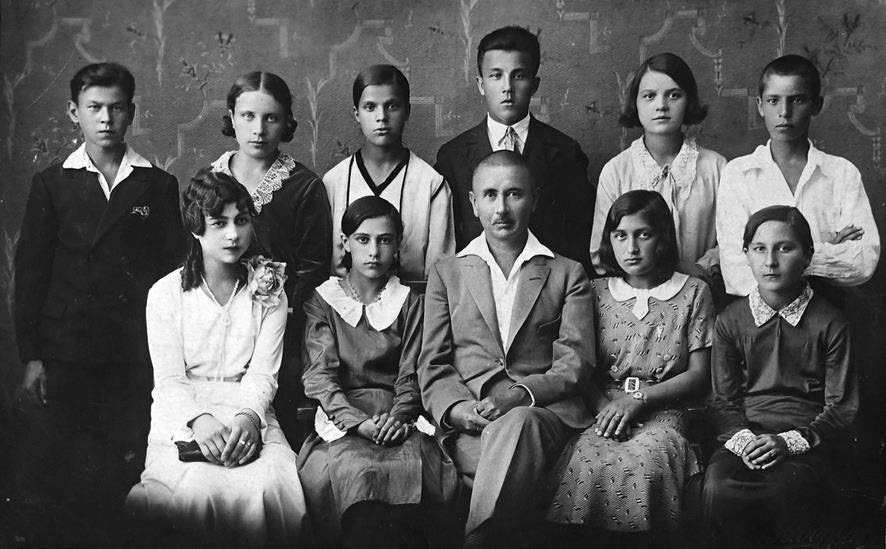
Alimjan with his students in Terijoki, Finland. (1931).

In the late 1920s, Alimcan Idris moved to Finland where he operated as a teacher for the children of the Tatar community. Among the community, Idris has been described as a demanding teacher and a tenacious spokesman of a "Turkish identity". He was involved in the founding of a school for the children. In 1929, he spoke at a wedding, where he for example stated the following: "..it's a shame that there's no Turkish school in this country, a school where the children of our community could educate themselves..". After the inspiring speech, money was raised and the school was established. In the early 1930s, Idris also taught at Narva.

Idris traveled back to Germany, where the Nazi government took advantage of his language skills. Idris worked at the Eastern Division of the Political Department of the German Foreign Ministry (das Orientreferat der Politischen Abteilung des Auswertigen Amts), where he produced anti-semitic National Socialist propaganda. Idris has been compared to Amin al-Husseini. However, it has also been noted, that Idris was a devout Muslim and "was not hostile to other religions and considered also Judaism in its origin to be equal revelation of God". After World War II ended, Idris moved to Saudi Arabia.

Idris went back to visit Finland multiple times during the 1940s and 1950s, especially Tampere, where its Tatar community would invite him to their celebrations. During those times, his favorite song called "Mahbüs şahzade" was always played. It has been interpreted as reminding him of his days at the war camp.

Idris died in Saudi Arabia. He was buried in Munich, Germany, where his children lived.

Alimjan Idris was married to Shamsebanat Idris. They had three children: boys Orhan, Ildar, and a daughter, Gulnar. Son Orhan Sadik-Khan (1929–2007), who settled in the United States, was the father of Janette Sadik-Khan, former commissioner of the New York City Department of Transportation.

== Versions of name ==
Alimdzhan Dzhagfarovich Idris, Ğälimcan Cäğfär ulı İdrisi, Ğalimcan İdris, Galimdzhan Idris, Alimjan Idris, Alimcan Idris, Alimdžan Idris, Alim Can İdris, Alim Idris, Alim al-Idris, Alim Idrîsî.

== Literature which includes Idris ==
- Ingvar Svanberg and David Westerlund: Muslim Tatar Minorities in the Baltic Sea Region. 2016. ISBN 978-90-04-30880-0, 978-90-04-30584-7.
- Gerdien Jonker: On the Margins - Jews and Muslims in Interwar Berlin. 2020. ISBN 978-90-04-42181-3, 978-90-04-41873-8.
- Gerdien Jonker: The Ahmadiyya Quest for Religious Progress. 2016. ISBN 978-90-04-30538-0, 978-90-04-30529-8.
  - "Brill - search results for Alimcan Idris".
