= Ramil Belyaev =

Russian-born Tatar imam in Finland (born 1978)

- Рамиль Беляев
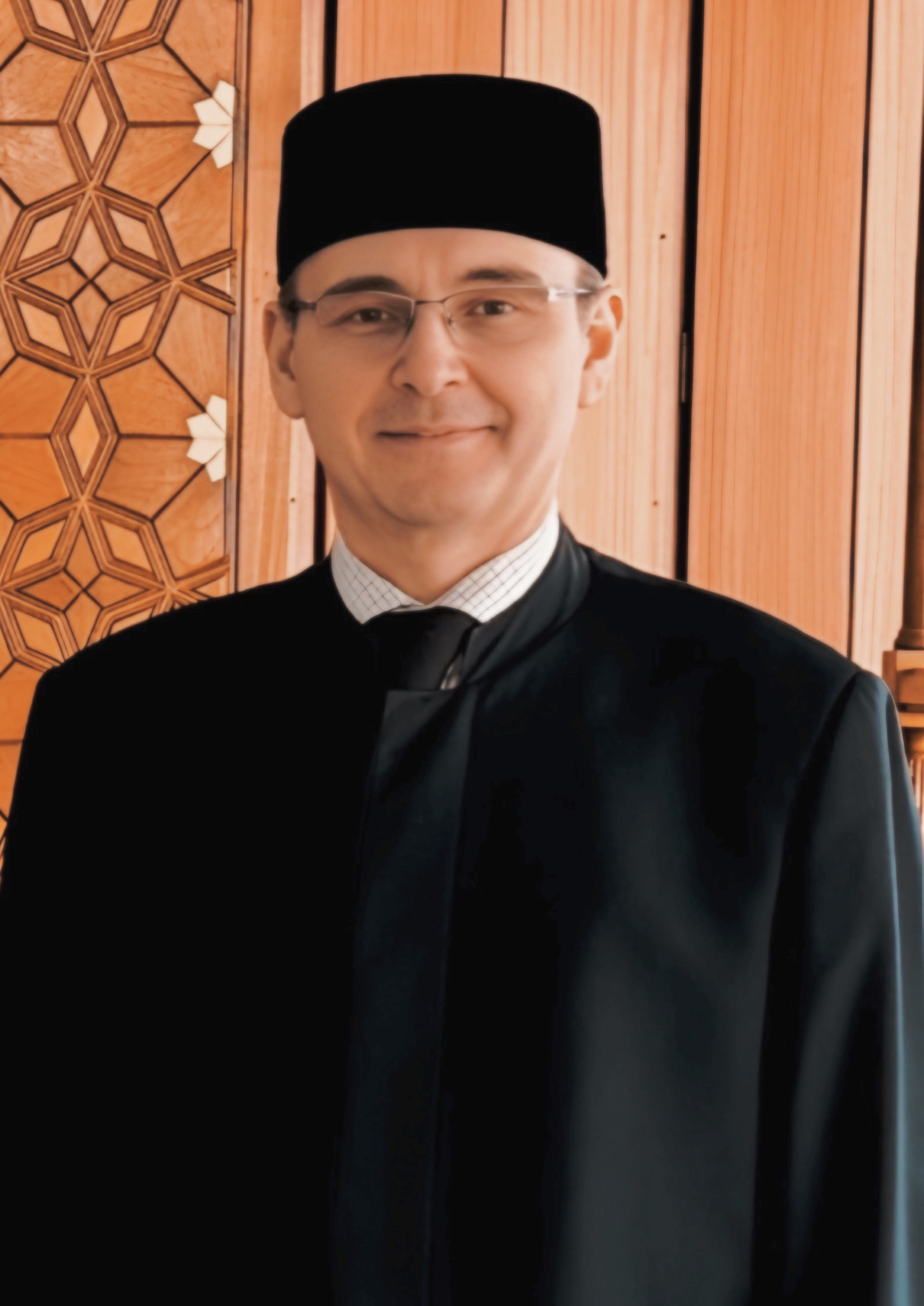
- Belyaev in 2026
- Born: 1978 (age 47–48); Safadzhay, Pilninsky District, Nizhny Novgorod Oblast, Soviet Union
- Other name: Ramil Bilal
- Education: PhD in philosophy, University of Helsinki (2017); Moscow Higher Spiritual Islamic College (2000)
- Occupations: Imam of the Finnish-Islamic Congregation (2004–)
- Predecessor: Abdurrahman Kaya
- Website: https://tatar.fi/

Ramil Faritovich Belyaev (also known as Ramil Bilal; Russian: Рамиль Фаритович Беляев; Tatar: Рамил Фәрит улы Беляев / Билал; born 1978 Nizhny Novgorod Oblast, Soviet Union) is a Russian-born Tatar imam of the Finnish Tatar community.

Belyaev was born in to a Tatar family in the Nizhny Novgorod Oblast (then Gorky Oblast) village Safadzhay (Safacay / Krasnaya Gorka). He moved to Finland in 2004 and has since served as the imam of the Finnish-Islamic Congregation, based in Helsinki. He was trained as an imam in Moscow, graduating from the Moscow Higher Spiritual Islamic College in 2000. After this, he worked as an imam-khatib in the city of Kolomna.

Belyaev holds a PhD in philosophy. He began studying the history of Finnish Tatars at the Department of History of the Kolomna State Pedagogical Institute and continued his studies at the University of Helsinki, where he completed a doctoral dissertation in history on the same subject in 2017. In 2019, Belyaev’s history book on the Finnish Tatars, based on his dissertation, was published in Russian with the support of Rustam Minnikhanov, head of Tatarstan. In 2024, it was published in Turkish in Ankara. When Finnish president Alexander Stubb met Turkish President Recep Tayyip Erdoğan in October 2024, he also attended the launch event of Belyaev’s book. Mehmet Ersoy, the Turkish Minister of Culture and Tourism, was present as well. In 2010, Belyaev had met Erdoğan when he visited the Finnish-Islamic-Congregation.

Belyaev has often taken part in religious discussions in Finland and has emphasized the importance of interfaith dialogue and peace.

Belyaev is a hajji.

== Works ==
Literature:

- Татары Финляндии – история, интеграция, сохраненне идентичности. ТДИ. Kazan, 2019. ISBN 978-5-6043753-3-4
- Ramazan ayätläre = Ramadanin jakeet. I. Finlandiya İslam Cemaati. Helsinki, 2018. ISBN 978-952-99306-9-2
- Sürälär häm doalar II. Finlandiya İslam Cemaati. 2017, Helsinki. ISBN 978-952-99306-5-4
- Sürälär häm doalar I. Finlandiya İslam Cemaati. 2016, Helsinki. ISBN 978-952-99306-4-7

Documentaries:

- Pyhä perintö / İzge miras, 2014.
- Moskeijaan johtanut tie, 2012.
