= Lotfi Nasib =

Finnish ice hockey player

Lotfi Nasib Лотфи Насыйбуллин Лотфи Насыйбулла
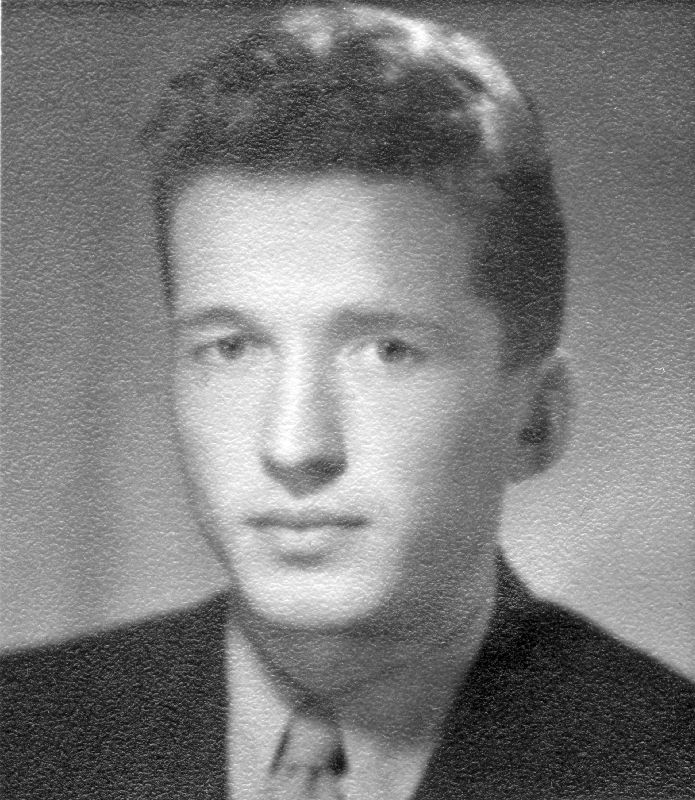
- Nasib during his younger years.
- Born: 13 May 1926 Kotka, Finland
- Died: 28 March 2011 (aged 84)
- Position: Attacker
- Played for: Ilves
- Playing career: 1943–1954

Lotfi Nasib (né Nasibullen/Nasibulla, Tatar: Лотфи Насыйбуллин/Насыйбулла; Lotfi Nasıybullin/Nasıybulla; 13 May 1926 - 28 March 2011) was a Finnish ice hockey player who played in SM-sarja as an attacker during 1943-1954, where he represented the Tampere-based team Ilves and won six championships. Nasib also played in two World Championships and 24 national matches. Nasib operated as the captain of Ilves during 1950-1951 season. Nasib was inducted into the Finnish Hockey Hall of Fame in 1985, as number 15.

In 1952, Nasib joined the German hockey team Harvestehuder THC Hamburg. He was paid by the team and therefore can be considered one of the first Finnish hockey players that got compensated abroad.

Lotfi was a part of the Finnish Tatar community. His parents were Neuman and Mahira Nasibullen/Nasibulla. Brother of Lotfi, Naim, and his son Erkan Nasib also played for Ilves.

== Sources ==
- Baibulat, Muazzez: Tampereen Islamilainen Seurakunta: juuret ja historia. Gummerus Kirjapaino Oy. Jyväskylä, 2004.ISBN 952-91-6753-9.
- Leinonen, Kimmo: Koulukadun Sankarit, Tampereen jääkiekkoilun historia 1928-1965. APALI, 2014. ISBN 978-952-5877-38-0.
