= Finnish Tatars =

Tatar ethnic group in Northern Europe

Tatar: Финляндия татарлары Finnish: Suomen tataarit
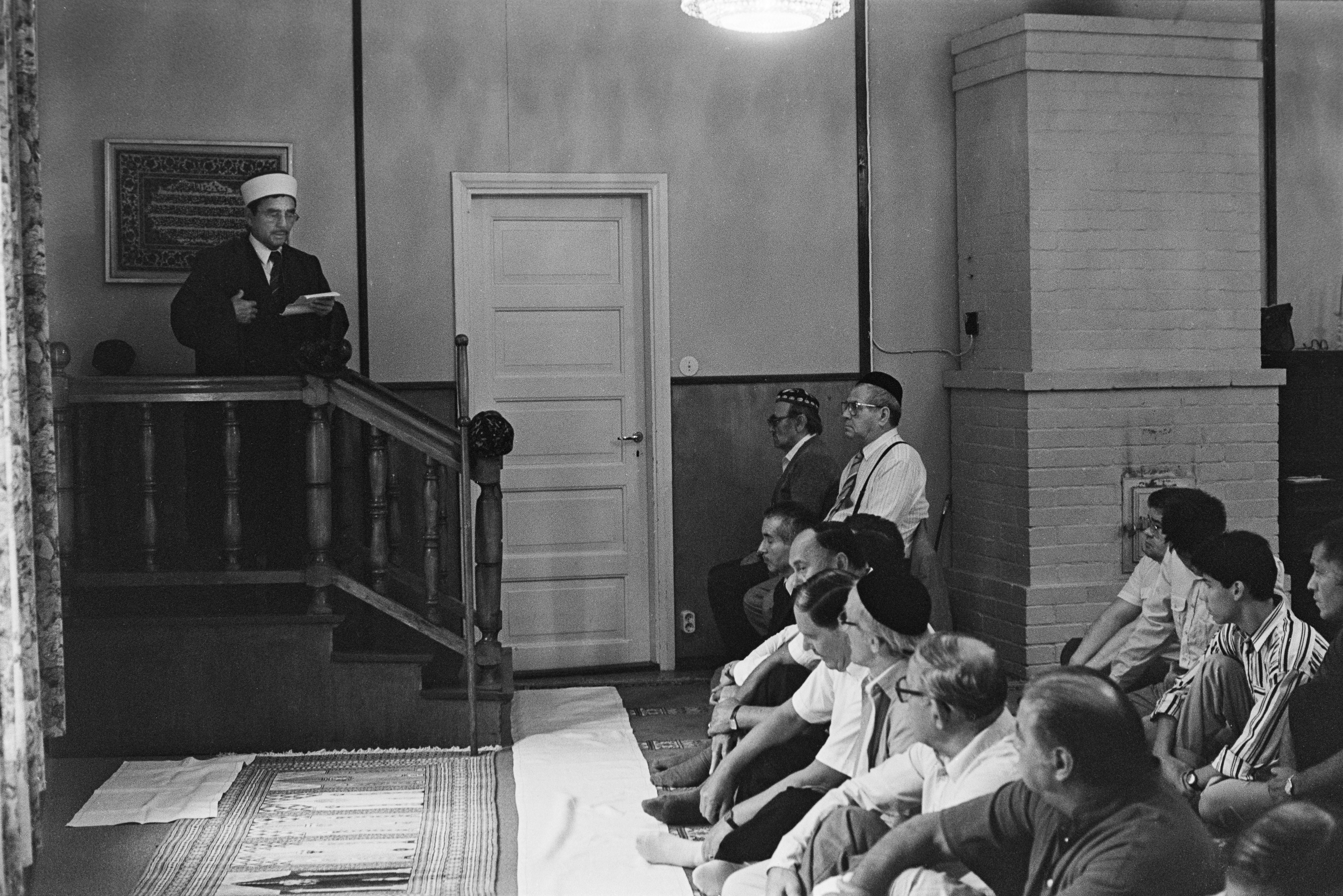
- Imam Enver Yıldırım and Finnish Tatars during a prayer service at the Järvenpää Mosque in 1989.

Total population
- Finland 600–700 (year 2020)
- Helsinki, Tampere, Turku, Järvenpää

Languages
- Tatar (Mishar dialect), Finnish

Religion
- Sunni Islam

Related ethnic groups
- Mishar Tatars and other Volga Tatars

The Finnish Tatars (Finnish Tatar: Finlandiya tatarları; Finnish: Suomen tataarit, Tatar: Финляндия татарлары, romanized: Finləndiyə tatarları;) are a Tatar ethnic group and minority in Finland, consisting of approximately 600–700 people. Tatars practice Sunni Islam and speak the Turkic Tatar language.

The community was formed between the late 1800s and the early 1900s, when Mishar Tatar merchants emigrated from the Nizhny Novgorod Governorate of the Russian Empire and eventually settled in Finland. Tatars have the main building of their congregation in Helsinki. They have also founded cultural associations in different cities. They are the oldest Muslim community in Finland.

The identity of the Finnish Tatars has had different reference points throughout their history. In the early days, they were known by their religious identity (Muslims). When the Republic of Turkey was established, Finnish Tatars, who speak a Turkic language, began identifying themselves as "Turks". (Note: The Finnish word turkkilainen can mean either "Turkish" or "Turkic", but as an individual word usually refers to a Turkish person.) They were influenced by Turkish culture; for example, they adopted the Latin alphabet, which replaced the previously used Arabic one. Nowadays, Finnish Tatars once again identify as Tatars and are very connected to Tatarstan. Its head, Rustam Minnikhanov, has visited the community.

Finnish Tatars have also maintained their connections to Turkey, however. President of Turkey Recep Tayyip Erdoğan, among others, has visited their congregation. In 2024, a history book of the Finnish Tatars by Dr. Ramil Belyaev, imam of the Finnish-Islamic congregation, was translated into Turkish and released in Ankara.

== History ==
=== The first Muslims in Finland ===
It is believed that the first Turkic peoples who migrated to Finland during the early modern period were mostly Volga Tatars and Bashkirs, some of whom were also deployed in Cossack units during the Great Northern War, First Russo-Swedish War, and Second Russo-Swedish War. There were also mullahs staying on Finnish soil in the 1800s; for example, Izzätulla Timergali, who was the mullah in Sveaborg from 1866 to 1906.

=== Migration of Tatar merchants ===
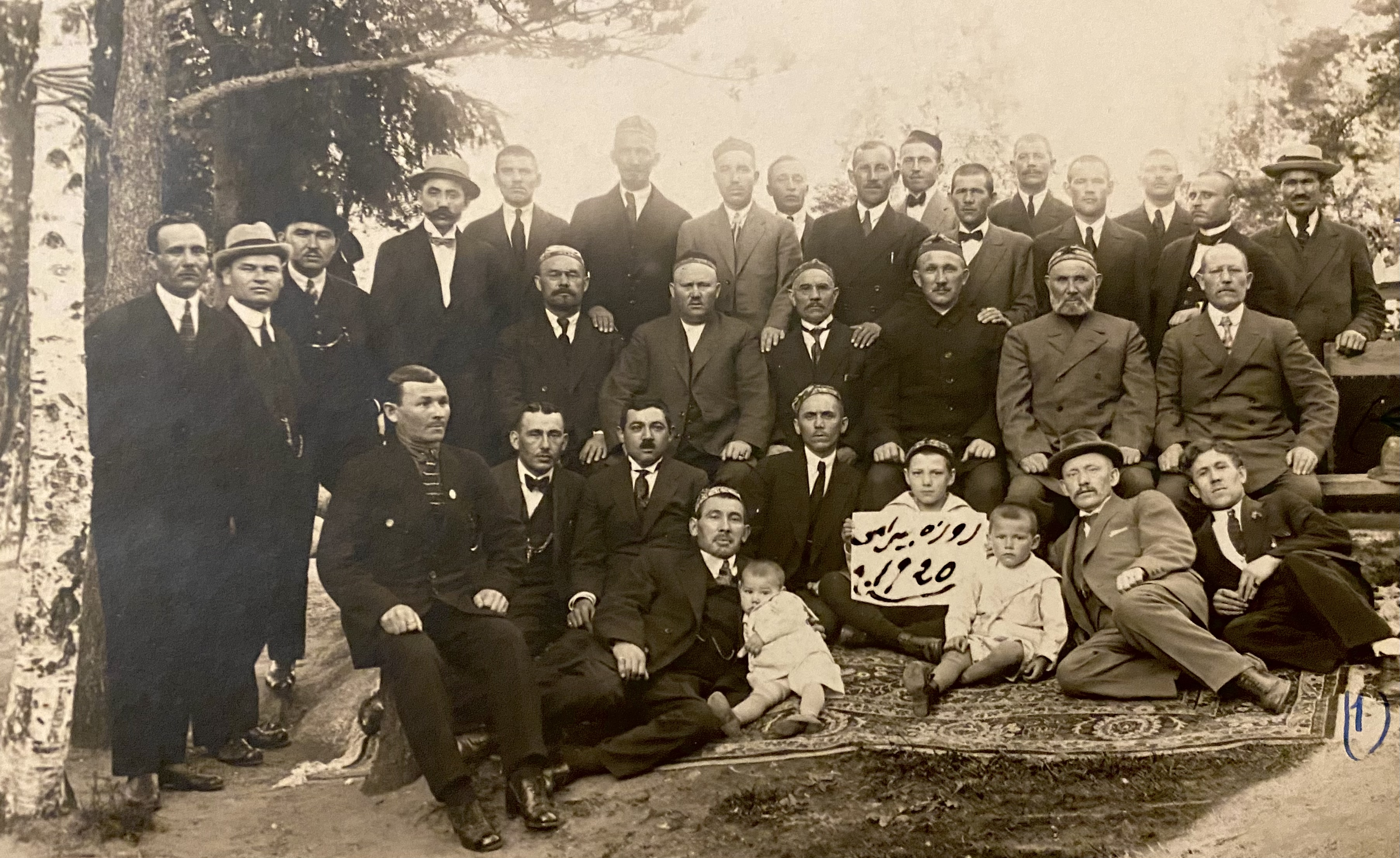
Tatars in Helsinki, year 1920.

The migration of Tatars to Finland happened in the late 1800s and early 1900s. Tradition tells that the first Tatar merchant in Finland was the grandfather of Hasan Hamidulla, who arrived from Saint Petersburg to Vyborg in 1868. Other Tatar merchants named as the first ones on Finnish soil are Alautdin Salavat and Samaletdin Yusuf. The last Tatar migration wave happened in the 1920s, when the merchants who had settled in the country brought their family members in.

These merchants were mostly Mishar Tatars, who originated from neighboring villages in Nizhny Novgorod Governorate, Sergachsky District, Russia. Many of them were from Aktuk. At their home villages, Mishars worked as farmers, but eventually they became merchants, due to lack of income. They usually sold fabrics, furs, clothes and soap. Their trips reached Saint Petersburg at first, and eventually, Finland.

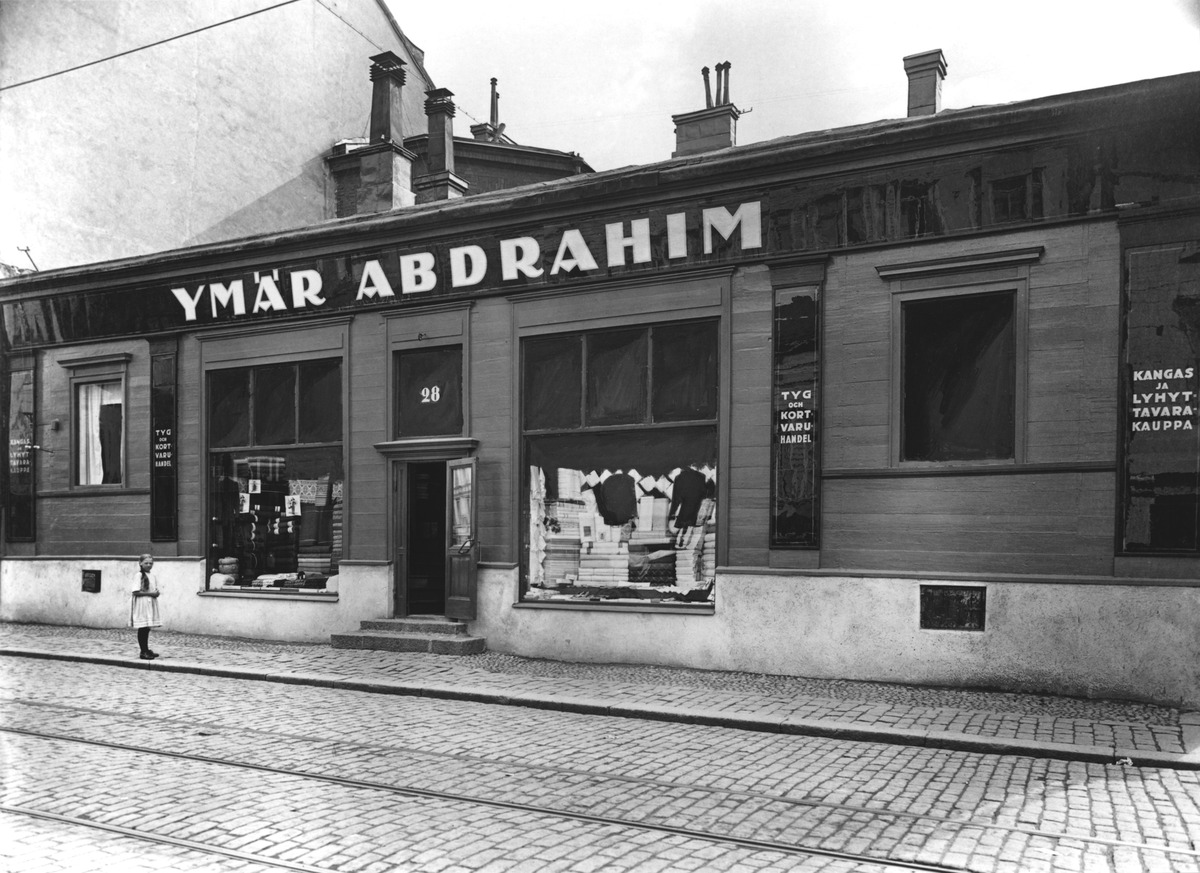
Shop of Ymär Abdrahim, 1920s.

Finland (until 1917, Grand Duchy of Finland) therefore in the beginning was just a new territory to do business in. Already in the early 1880s, Tatar merchants were seen in the country, many dozens at once. Their trips had become regular especially after the Riihimäki-Saint Petersburg railway completing years before. In 1891, the railroads already reached for example to Oulu and Kemi. At first, they returned to their homes after earning enough, but after it became evident that the business conditions were better on Finnish soil, they started to settle in the country permanently. The relatively good reception of the Finns also helped. Many Tatars settled in Vyborg at first, but after it was lost to Soviet Union, they moved mainly to Helsinki, Turku, and Tampere, where some fellow Tatars had already settled. Soon, many of them transitioned into selling in halls. For example, in Vyborg halls, they sold cotton products, silk fabrics, carpets and furs. Terijoki was also an important place for business before it too was lost to Soviet Union. In Tampere, fabric was often the main product being sold. Many of them also set up their own shops.

=== Migration of Tatar families ===
Many Tatars who had settled into Finland started to arrange their family members to the country after the 1917 Russian Revolution. This however, was mostly possible only after 1921, because the border of Russia and Finland was closed until the Treaty of Tartu. The relatives of these Tatar merchants had to plead for a visa from the delegations of Moscow or Saint Petersburg. They also got help for example from professor Yrjö Jahnsson, who had connections that assisted them in the migration. The migration was mainly possible until 1929. After that, some who came, came illegally or for big ransom.

=== Finnish citizenship ===
While Tatars in Finland started to apply for a Finnish citizenship soon after the country's independence in 1917, still in 1939, as many as half of the community stayed in the country with Nansen passports. One reason for this was that the Finnish government demanded them to prove that they had been in the country for at least five years without leaving, and that they can provide for themselves and their families. These things got easier to prove after the second world war. The first citizenship was granted to a Tatar named Sadik Ainetdin in 1919.

=== Wartime ===
==== Prisoners of war ====
After the Winter War in 1940, there were 367 Russian prisoners in Turku central prison. These included Tatars. Some of them; Ibrahim Rahman, Halidulla Utarbai, Zekeriye Abdulla and Salih Zahidulla joined the Tatar congregation after being freed but by the end of the decade they had left Finland. The Finnish State Police made a search warrant for many Muslim soldiers who had not gone back to the Soviet Union.

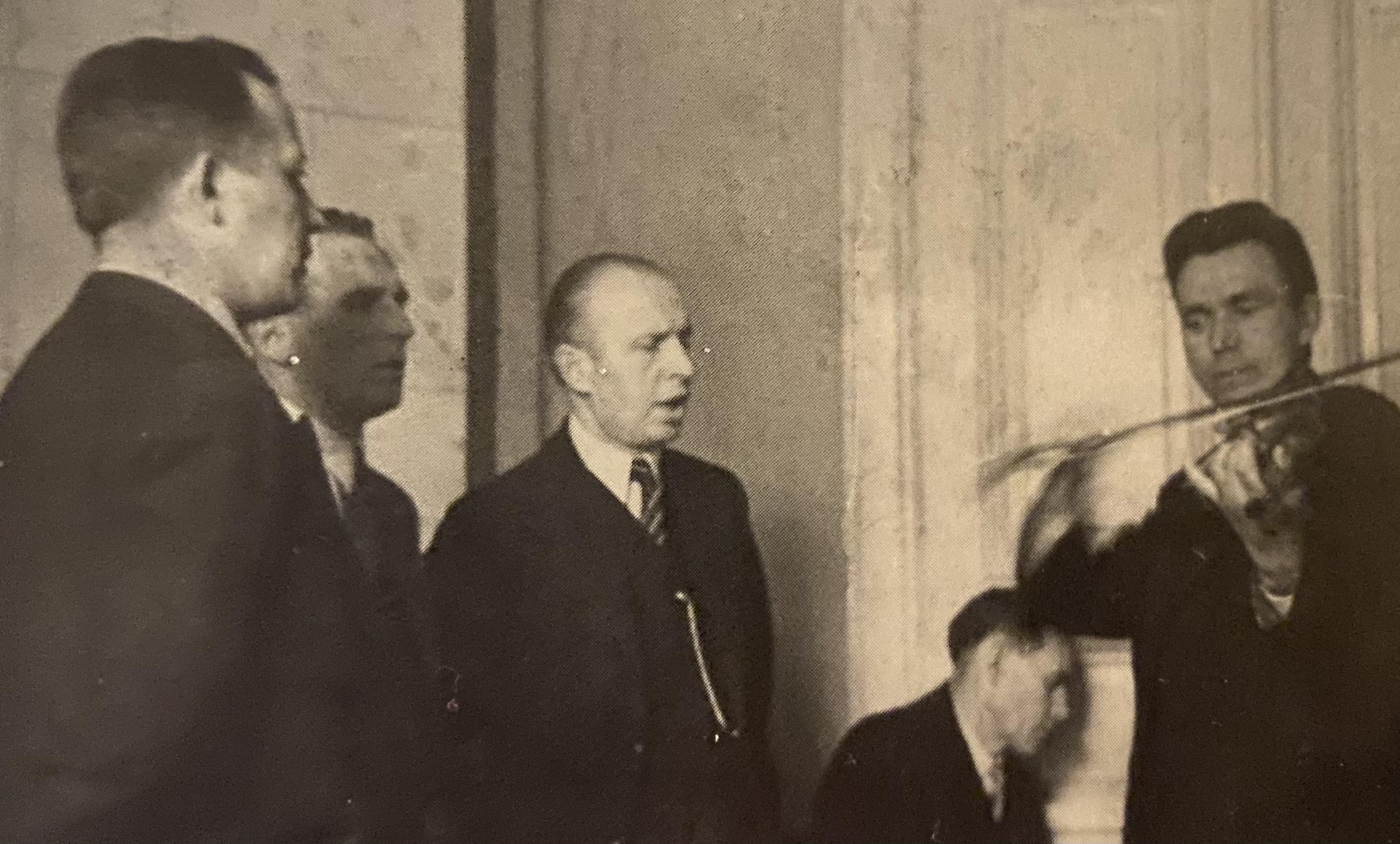
Kazan Tatar war prisoner Mahmut Rahim playing violin in Tampere, year 1944. He is accompanied by Fatih Arat (left), Letfulla Baibulat, Aisa Hakimcan, and Bilaletdin Kaader.

In January 1945, most of the Muslims who had stayed on Finnish soil after the war returned to the Soviet Union "voluntarily but reluctantly". Some of the few who were able to stay for longer included an Avar named Halid Hamido, who during the war had married a Finnish woman and converted to Christianity. In Finland, the prisoners of war were employed by the Samaletdin and Ainetdin families, Ymär Sali, Zuhur Tahir, Ibrahim Hamidulla, Ibrahim Arifulla and also the two Muslims who themselves had recently emigrated to Finland; a Kazakh Ömmet Kenschahmet and a Lezgin Velibek Alibek. Thirty or so "war migrants" had been in under charge at the Helsinki Tatar congregation from February 1942. A Kazan Tatar, teacher Mahmut Rahim delivered prayers at the Tampere Tatar Congregation during 1942–1944.

==== Tatars from Estonia ====
At the turn of the twentieth century, five Tatar families lived in Estonia. In the 1920s, more of them had settled in Tallinn, Narva, Jõhvi, and Rakvere, after which the number of Tatars was around 200–300. At the end of 1943, many came to Finland on motorboat rides. They registered as political refugees and applied to the Finnish military forces, where three Estonian Tatars, Ibrahim Zarip, Ahmed Haerdinov and Rafik Moks were admitted. Zarip was accepted as a sailor at the Turku naval station and after his service moved to Sweden and later to New York. Haerdinov, after his service moved to Sweden; Moks on the other hand to Canada. Six Estonian Tatars and their families received residence permit and later on, two families acquired a citizenship. Their recommenders were the Samaletdin family, imam Weli-Ahmed Hakim and merchant Ymär Abdrahim.

Due to the fear of deportation and the uncertain conditions in Finland, many Estonian Tatars who came to Finland continued their journey to Sweden, and especially to the Greater Stockholm area. Before their arrival, only one Tatar, a tanner named Ibrahim Umarkajeff is known to have lived in Sweden. In 1949, the Tatars who had settled in Sweden founded an association that was initially called Turk-Islam Föreningen i Sverige för Religion och Kultur ('Swedish Turkish-Islamic Religious and Cultural Association'), later shortened to Islam Församlingen i Sverige ('Swedish Islamic Congregation'). The association maintained a cemetery in the southern part of Stockholm. The Tatars lost their majority in the Islamic association in the 1960s and 1970s. In the 1980s, it was estimated that there were about 50 so-called full-blooded and 30 half-blooded Tatars in the country. Didar Samaletdin, a Tatar woman founded a restaurant called Djingis Khan in Södermalm with her husband in 1983.

=== Connections to home ===
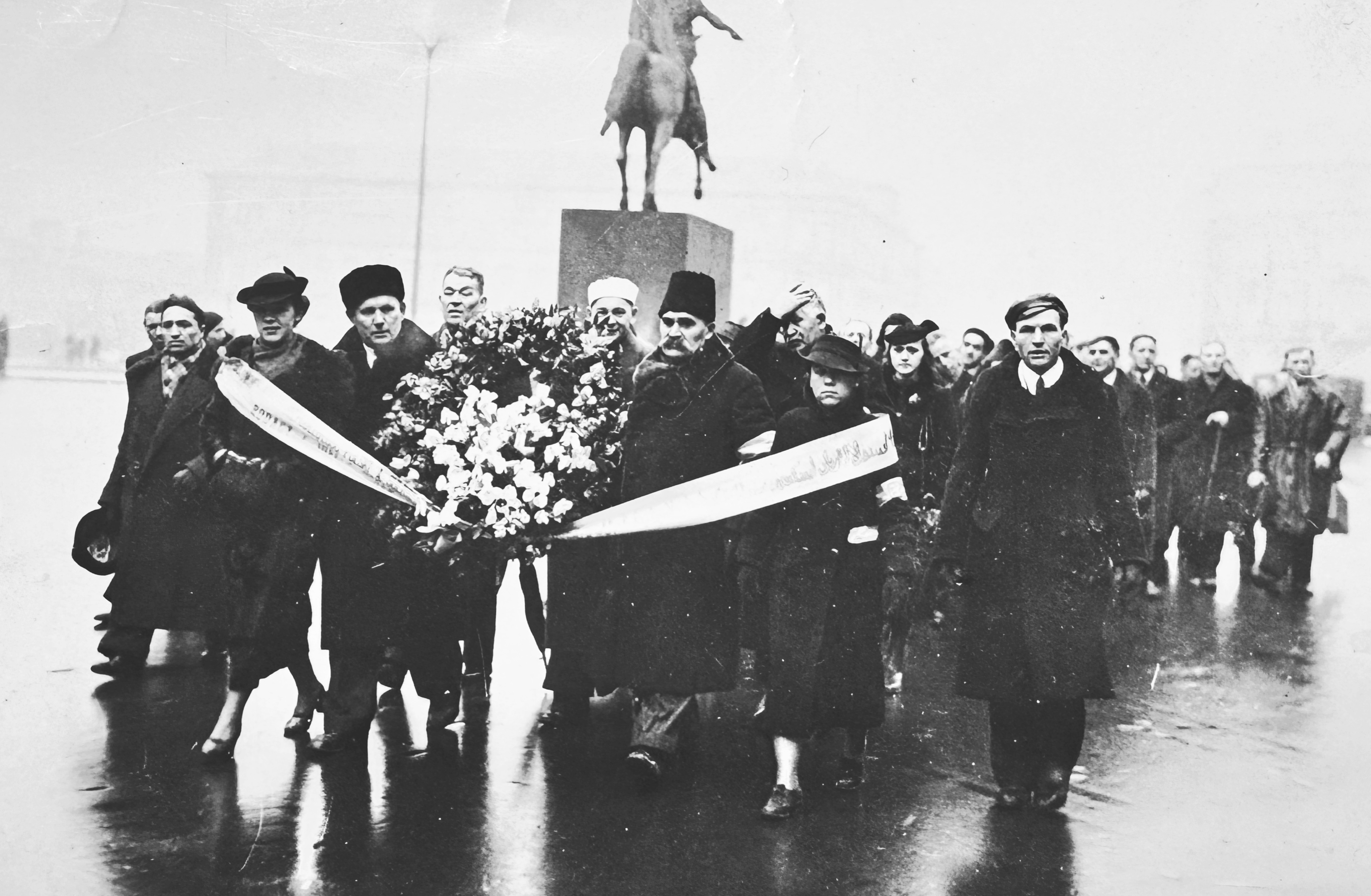
Idel-Ural State memorial service in Warsaw, Poland (February 1938), organized by Ayaz İshaki. A few Tatars from Finland also participated.

By the beginning of the 20th century, Leningrad (Saint Petersburg) had its own Tatar community, largely formed by Mishars from Nizhny Novgorod region. Some of them continued their trip to Finland, others stayed in the city. The Tatars in Finland kept their connections with the Tatar relatives in Leningrad and elsewhere up until the 1930s, traveling across the border illegally through the 1920s. Their ties were cut after tightened border control. Before this, they had also helped the Tatars in Leningrad by sending them money. They also personally helped theologian Musa Bigiev. When he got arrested in Moscow in 1923, the Finnish Tatar community sent a letter to the Turkish government, asking for help in releasing him. In 1930, the community also tried to bring Bigiev in the country.

As correspondence and travel to the Soviet Union opened in the mid-1950s, it was possible for them to re-establish their broken connections. It wasn't until the turn of the 1960s and 1970s however that contacts with Kazan, the capital of Tatarstan began to strengthen as they received Tatar guests from across the border. They had Bashkir artists as their guests in 1967, a little before the Kazan Tatars. They were able to visit their home villages at the end of the 20th century.

=== Tatars in Berlin ===
Berlin served as a kind of meeting place for many Tatars and other Turkic exiles in the early 20th century. The Soviet intelligence agency Joint State Political Directorate was also aware of this; "The Muslims of Kazan, St. Petersburg and Finland maintain very active contacts with Berlin, where the head of the foreign Tatar counter-revolution currently gathers". Finnish professor Yrjö Jahnsson went to Berlin to meet the Bashkir activist Zeki Velidi Togan in 1925. According to him, Jahnsson's aim was to "unite the Finns and the Asian nations captured by the Russians against the Russian colonial interests". A year earlier, Finnish Tatars Zinnetullah Ahsen and Imad Samaletdin had traveled to meet Togan and Tatar activist Ayaz İshaki in the city to discuss their attempts to produce a Finnish translation of the Quran.

Young Muslim emigrants also went to study in Berlin. In 1918, under the leadership of theologian Alimcan Idris, the "Assistance Society for Russian Muslim Students" was founded there, the purpose of which was to help students maintain connections with their homeland and bring new students to the city. In a 1972 interview with a Finnish sociologist Pertti Rautio, the Tatar couple Semiulla and Mahruse Wafin, who themselves had studied in Berlin described Tatar students in Germany as follows: "Many of them became scientists, teachers at the universities of Istanbul and Ankara. Most of them were Turkologists. Others were doctors, chemists, those who had attended the University of Economics and Business and these received employment in their field in Turkey and usually they were professors there."

=== Religious formation ===
The first registered Tatar and at the same time the first Islamic formation in Finland was founded in 1915. It was called "Helsingin musulmaanien hyväntekeväisyysseura" ("Helsinki Moslems' Charity Club"). During that time, terms like Moslem and Mohammedan were used, rather than Muslim or Islamic. An actual congregation was founded in 1925, after Finnish legal approval of given practices was granted in 1922. Finland therefore became the first western country that gave Muslims official recognition. The congregation was at first named "Suomen muhamettilainen seurakunta" (the "Finnish Mohammedan Congregation") and later, from 1963 forwards, the Finnish-Islamic Congregation. They didn't get the right to wed their community members until 1932, however, because authorities believed that it would lead to polygamy, even though it was not practiced among the Tatars.

Religious formations were also founded elsewhere in Finland, such as the Tampere Islamic Congregation, founded in 1942. During the same year, a wooden mosque was built in Järvenpää by members of the community.

The community undertook its first pilgrimage to Mecca in the 1920s.

=== Cultural formation ===
In order to conserve and develop their culture in Finland, Tatars have established their own cultural associations. For example, in 1935, they established the Helsinki-based Suomen turkkilaisten seura (Association of Finnish Turks) and Tampereen Turkkilainen Yhdistys (Tampere Turkish Society), and two years later, the Turun Turkkilais-Tataarilainen Yhdistys (Turku Turko-Tatar Association). These formations have mainly focused on organizing their own cultural events and publishing. They and their religious congregation have also arranged language instruction for their children. In Helsinki, they had their own school, Turkkilainen kansakoulu (Turkish Volksschule), which was shut down in 1969 after lack of students.

=== Identity in Finland ===
==== Background ====
The Tatar diaspora in Finland has always been very connected with each other, their roots leading mostly to the same areas. Yet, there has been conflict among them when it comes to their identity. These disagreements have mostly focused on their ethnonym, Tatars.

Under the Russian Empire, Volga Tatars generally did not identify as Tatars, but rather as Muslims (möselman) or by their own group names (qazanlı, mişär / meshcheryaki). The name Bolgar also appeared, which refers to the theory of them being at least partially the descendants of Bolgars. The second, main theory for their formation is them being descendants of "Tatars" of the Golden Horde, as in, mostly Kipchaks. Originally it was indeed the feudal nobility of Golden Horde that used the term to denote its citizens, and eventually, Russian feudals and the Tsarist government started to use it as well. In addition to possibly wanting to stick to their different group identities rather than be all lumped in together as Tatars (even until 1926 census), it is speculated that they avoided accepting the ethnonym because it created a negative reference to the "old enemies of the Russian state", the Mongols, and especially to the soldiers of Genghis Khan, who were known as "Tatars" during the 1200s.

At the turn of the century, Tatars in Finland also mostly identified themselves by their religion (Muslim). After Turkey was established (1923), it became a kind of reference point to their "Turkic identity", and therefore they started to call themselves simply Turks, or alternatively, Volga Turks or Turks of North. (The name of the ancient Kipchaks was also referenced.)

Some Tatars from Kazan ended up moving to Turkey. In Finland, there were such people as well, for example, the businessman-publisher Zinnetullah Ahsen Böre, who became a Turkish citizen, and hoped that others would also join the "Great Turkish nation". (In Finnish language, there is no one separate word for Turkish and Turkic; turkkilainen can technically mean both.)

Not everyone approved of the idea. Some of them remained hopeful that the Tatars in Russia would be able to establish an independent nation, which was briefly represented by the Idel-Ural State (1918). This interest had been sparked by Idel-Ural figures visiting Finland and also by Finnish activists who were knowledgeable about Turkic peoples. Tatar activists Sarif Daher and Hasan Kanykoff were founding members of the association called Etuvartiokansojen klubi, which purpose was to help the minority peoples in Russia and create cooperation with them and independent Finland.

==== Impact on culture ====
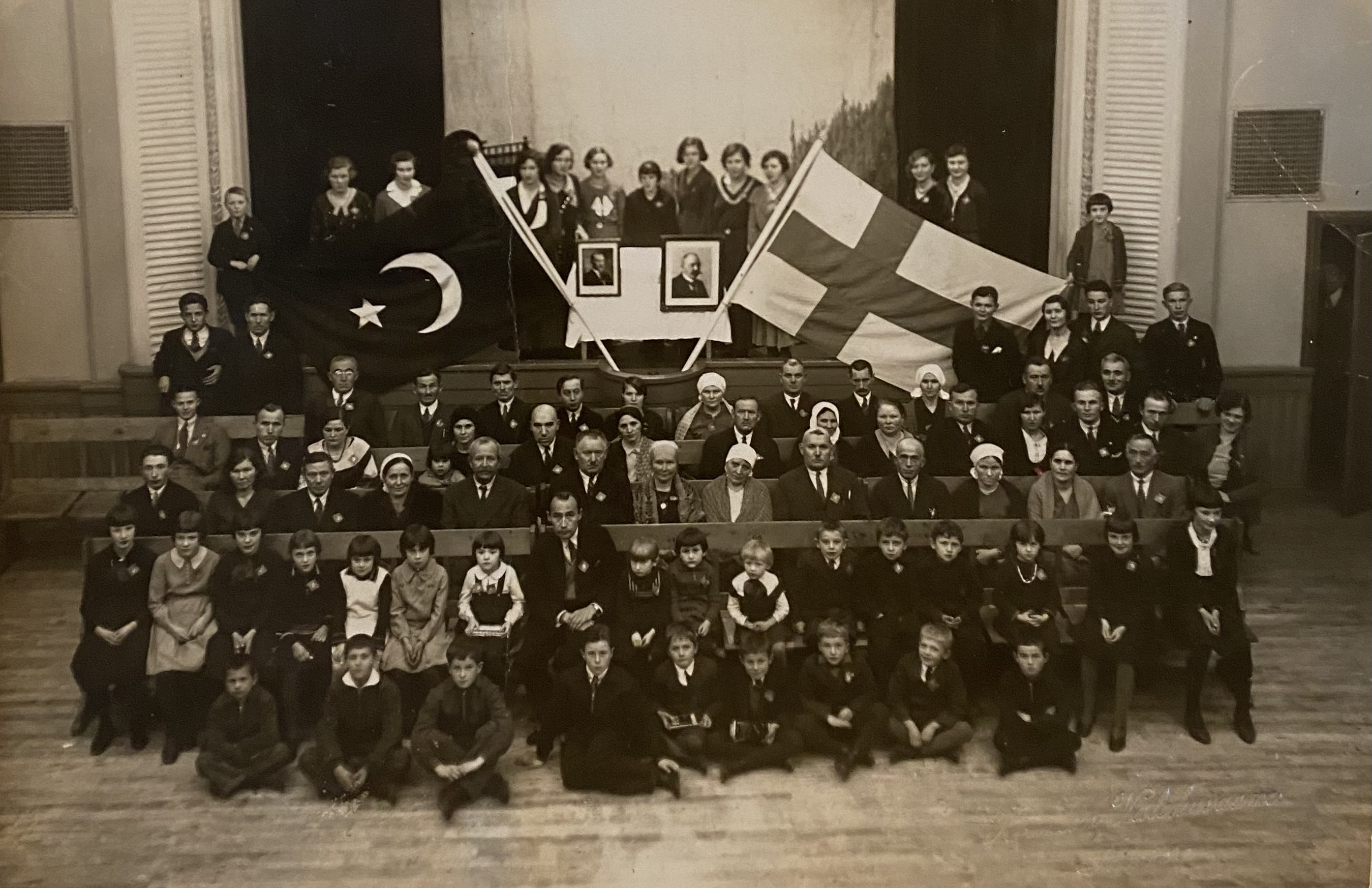
Tatars in Tampere, year 1933. Celebrating the Republic of Turkey. Musa Bigiev can be seen peeping through the door on right; he did not want to appear in the picture and possibly cause trouble to his family left behind in the Soviet Union.

The influence of Turkey had impact on the names of their establishments, personal names and language. Associations used name "Turkish", instead of "Tatar". Referring to their language, they called it "Turkish". In their personal names, the most noticeable change was the letter Ä, which was replaced with Turkish E (for example: Ahsän → Ahsen). In the footsteps of Atatürk's reforms, the Finnish Tatars replaced the previously used Arabic script for a Latin script. The Turkish language was appreciated within the community, and they partly tried to pronounce and write according to it.

==== Current day ====
The Tatar ethnonym has since solidified among the people. In Finland, after the era of Turkish influence, a new connection to "Tatar roots" started to form after they received visitors from Tatarstan in the late 1960s. The community itself also had the opportunity to visit Kazan, and eventually the villages of their ancestors. Also, the desire to not be confused with Turks of Turkey arriving to Finland might have played a part. The community identified themselves publicly as Tatars in 1974, when in Järvenpää they organized "a day of Tatar culture", open for Finns. After this, however, conflicts rose again inside the community. Tatar was still referred to as a "Russian epithet".

=== Tatars during the Finnish wars ===
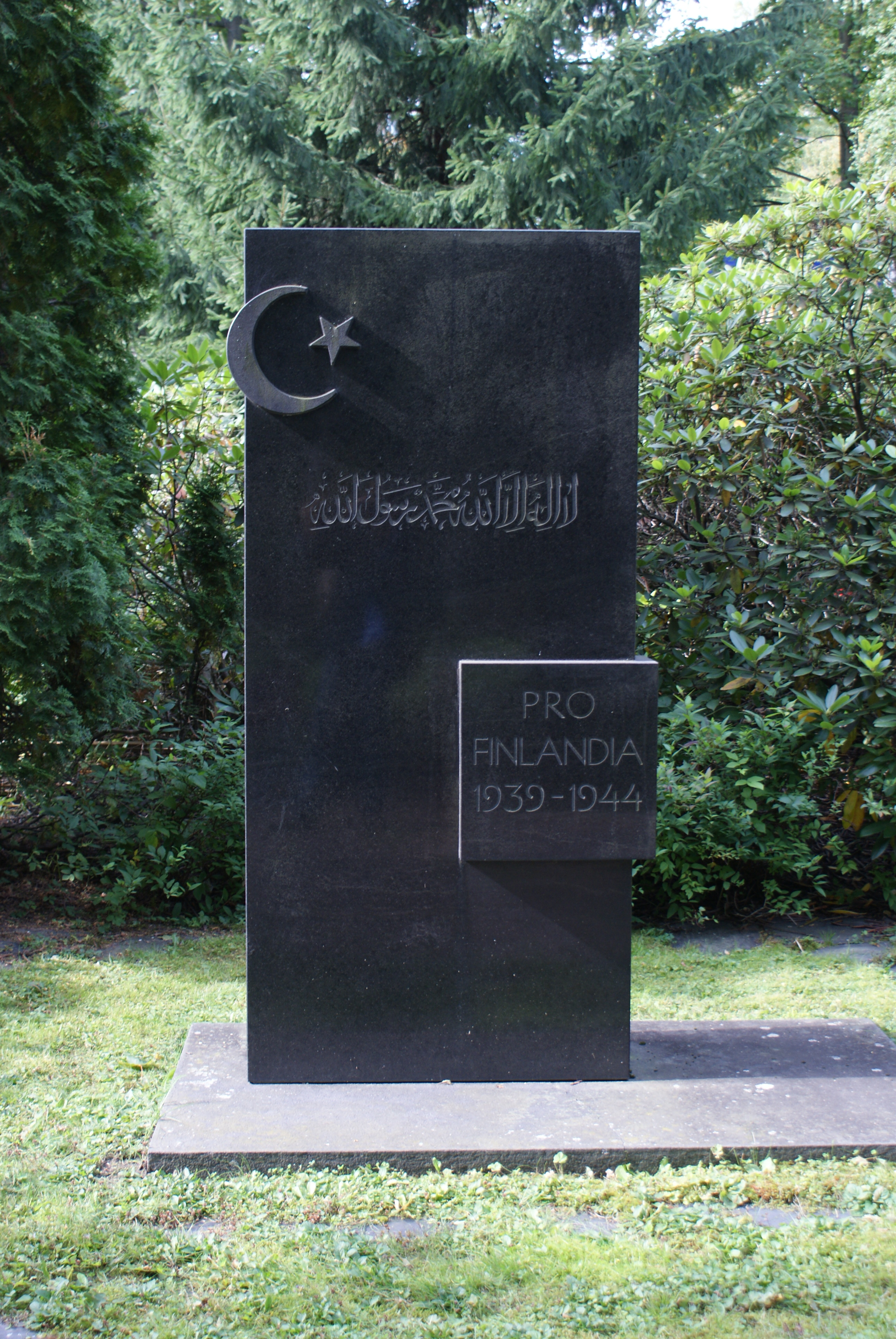
Monument for the Tatar soldiers at the Helsinki Islamic Cemetery.

In total, 156 members of the Finnish Tatar community took part in the Winter War and the Continuation War on the side of Finland. Ten of them died while serving. In addition, 26 were wounded, 7 of them permanently. 21 Tatar women operated at the Lotta Svärd organization.

In 1987, the names of the fallen Tatar soldiers were carved on a memory plate, which was placed inside on their congregation's main building wall. They have also been honored at the Islamic cemetery in Helsinki.

=== The reception of Tatars in Finland ===
The Tatar merchants who came to Finland were at times accused of trading without license and avoiding paying taxes. In general, however, Tatars were better thought of in Finland than in Russia, which is believed to have been their main reason for settling in the country. According to the Finnish authorities, the motive for the majority of merchants to come to the country was not discrimination experienced in Russia, but apparently simply the pursuit of a better standard of living. The purpose in the beginning was usually to return home after having earned enough.

If these Tatar emigrants experienced suspicions among the Finns, it usually did not focus on them being Muslim, rather, them being from Russia. From time to time, the Tatars came under accusations of a "communist spy". These were usually baseless accusations based on the alleged "pro-Bolshevik" opinions of individual Tatars. They gained trust from the law enforcers, because among them there were people who were on good terms with and worked together with Finnish university people and activists. A clear example of this is Hasan Kanykoff (1880 – 1954).

Based on individual interviews of later generations of Finnish Tatars, there has not been much discrimination in Finland apart from the occasional name calling, most notably tattari, a kind of intentionally distorted version of tataari. However, the epithet in question, led to an incident in 1961, as a result of which two Finnish Tatars were sent to prison and the third to payment for damages. The trio assaulted one metal shop operator, permanently damaging his sight. The man had allegedly called them "tattari" in a Helsinki restaurant on May Day night. The abusers together had to pay the victim a total of 1,105,000 Finnish marks.

Two more serious attacks against the community are known in Finland: In 1942, soldier Siadetdin Samlihan, during his free time, was shot to death in Helsinki, while walking on the street with his friend. The shooter was never found. It was speculated that the killer may have thought that the Tatars spoke Russian and therefore were Russian spies. The second incident was in Tampere during the 1990s, when a firebomb was thrown into a Tatar home.

=== Political refugees in the community ===
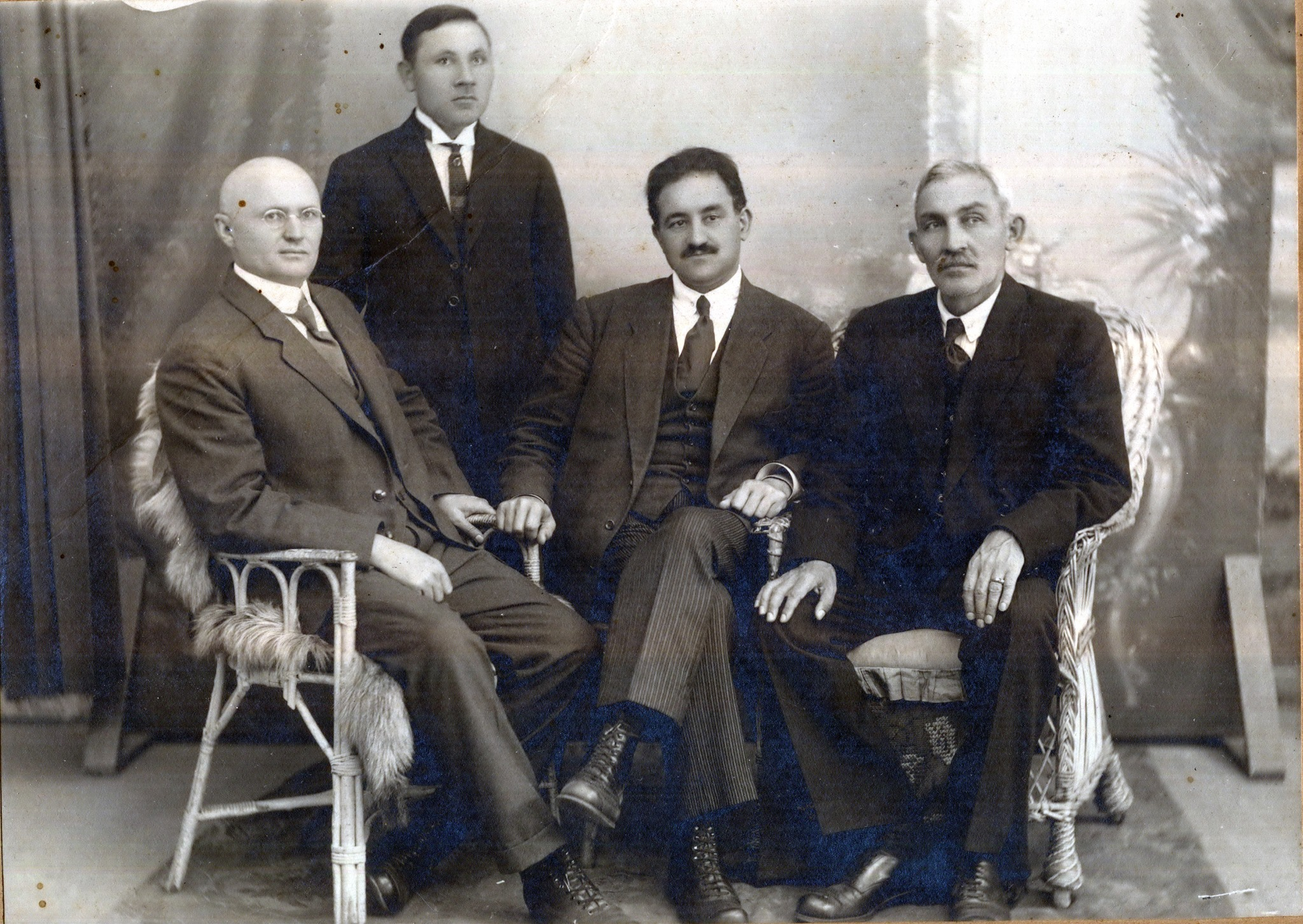
Mohammad Amin Rasulzadeh among Tatar political refugees Abdullah Battal, Mustafa Salah and Lutfi Ishaki in Hyvinkää, Finland.

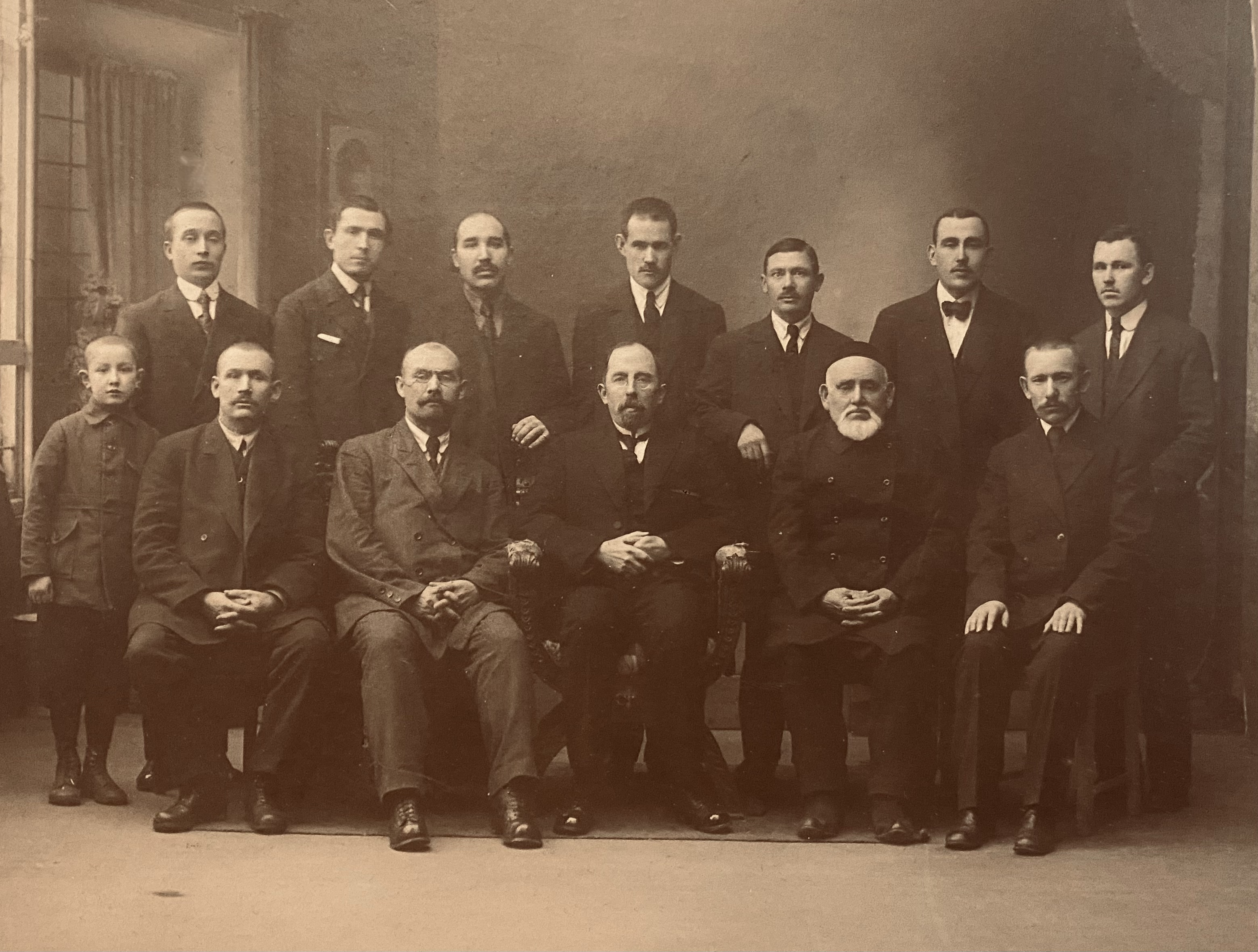
Sadri Maksudi (sitting middle) with Finnish Tatars in Tampere, year 1920.

After their failed pursuits of independence in 1918, many leaders of the Idel-Ural state began to settle in Finland. Their names were as follows; Yusuf Akçura, Ayaz Ishaki, Musa Bigiev, Zeki Velidi Togan, Sadri Maksudi Arsal, Alimcan Idris, Abdullah Battal Taymas, and the former imam of Saint Petersburg, Lutfi Ishaki. Idris and Battal stayed in the country for longer, due to operating as teachers and cultural influencers among the community, but the others shortly continued elsewhere, such as Germany, France, or Turkey. Some of them however returned to Finland later, for example Ayaz Ishaki, for whom the Tatar community of Tampere organized a three-day celebration in February 1937. Ishaki in return organized a 20-year memory celebration of Idel-Ural state in Warsaw in 1938, where seven Finnish Tatars were present.

In addition to Idel-Ural politicians, refugees among the Finnish Tatar community included also for example the later-theosophist and mason, Amina Syrtlanoff, who took part in establishing local Tatar congregation and made presentations on Islam.

=== Academic interest of Tatars in Finland ===
Tatars have been a subject of interest to many Finnish linguists. Researchers focused especially on Mishar Tatars are Martti Räsänen and Heikki Paasonen. Other curious ones include Mathias Alexander Castren, August Ahlqvist, and Gustaf John Ramstedt.

== Culture ==
=== Religion ===
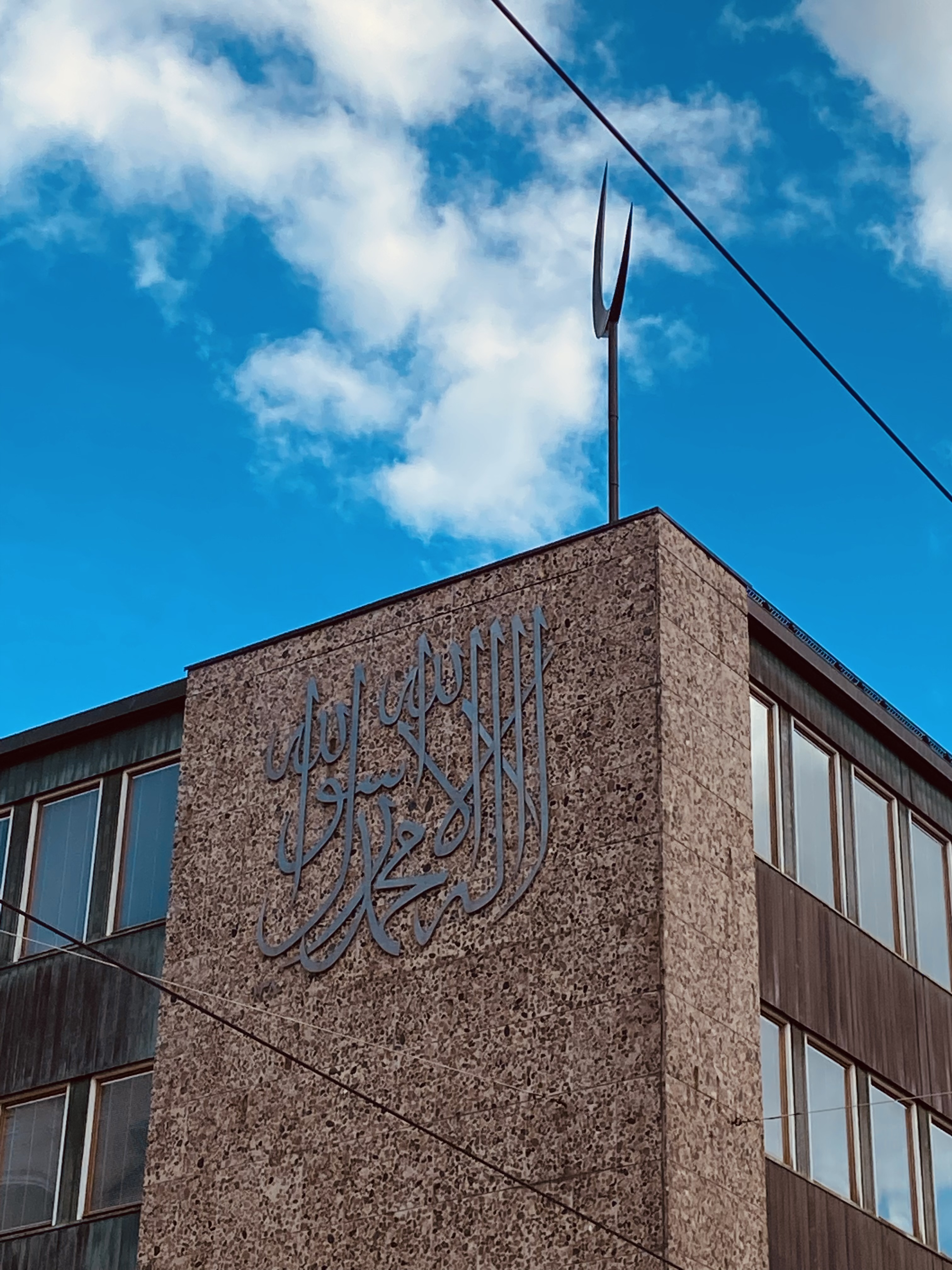
Building of the Finnish-Islamic Congregation in Helsinki.

Written Tatar by Fatima Wafa (Tampere, Finland 1930).

The Finnish Tatars are Sunni Muslims. They practice their religion at their own congregation, the Finnish-Islamic Congregation, which has its main building in Fredrikinkatu, Helsinki. The congregation also owns a wooden mosque in Järvenpää. The Tatars in Tampere have their separate congregation, which has its space in Hämeenkatu. The congregations accept only Tatars as their members.

In Finland, Tatars are known as an Islamic minority which keeps a low profile. They usually don't speak publicly about current topics regarding Islam in the country.

Members of the Finnish Tatar community have been making pilgrimages to Mecca since the 1920s. The international relations of the community have been deemed impressive. World leaders who have visited the community include Tunisian president Habib Bourguiba, Head of Tatarstan Rustam Minnikhanov and Turkish president Recep Tayyip Erdoğan. The congregation has also received imams from abroad, such as the Crimean Tatar Abdurrahman Kaya and Enver Yıldırım from Turkey. In 2020, the imam of the congregation is Russian-born Ramil Belyaev (Bilal) became imam of the congregation, while economist Gölten Bedretdin became chairman of the board; the latter is the first female to hold that position.

During the 1900s, The Tampere Tatar congregation also had a wide variety of guests as well. These include for example theologian Musa Bigiev, Idel-Ural president and refugee Sadri Maksudi Arsal, muftis Talgat Tadjuddin from Ufa and Rawil Gaynetdin from Moscow, Turkologist Reşit Rahmeti Arat and professor of Medina university, Abdullah Ahmed Zadri. Musicians include Haydar Bigichev. Chairman in 2020 is entrepreneur Vahit Wafin.

=== Language ===
Mishar Tatar Aisa Hakimcan (1896–1972), speaking the Tatar language (1952, Tampere).

The native language of Finnish Tatars is the Tatar language, more specifically its western dialect, Mishar. It differs from the dialect of the Kazan Tatars, which is standard Tatar. The current Finnish Tatar dialect differs also from the language of Mishars in Russia; for example, they do not use the letter X, only soft H.

Before adopting the Latin alphabet, Finnish Tatars, like the Tatars in Russia, used the Arabic script. In Finland also, the Tatars modified the script to better fit their language. (See: İske imlâ, Yaña imlâ.) Reformers include especially the writer-teacher Abdullah Battal (Later Battal-Taymas, 1883–1969), who adapted the spelling to a more phonetic manner. Battal strove to make the Tatar vowels clearly and consistently visible in the Arabic script and also to standardize the marking of consonants.

From 1930s forwards, the gradual transition to the Latin script began. Reasons for this were mainly the influence of Turkish culture that saturated the community at that time (Turkey had begun using the Latin alphabet in 1928), and at the same time, the similar movement called the Yanalif movement, which was happening in Soviet Union among the Tatars. By the 1950s, the publications of Finnish Tatars had mostly switched to the Latin alphabet. Before this, during the transition period, both were still used. In the teaching of the community's children, they changed to the Latin alphabet during the 1960s. The Tatars in Russia use the Cyrillic alphabet nowadays.

First version of Latin script was borrowed directly from Turkish. Over time, the script has been modified in different ways.

Āyah 286 of Al-Baqarah in Finnish Tatar:

Allah keşergä kütärä almasılık eş yöklämi. Ägär ul yahşı eşlär kılsa (savabı) üzenä bulır, ägär naçar eş eşläşä (gönahı) üzenä bulır. Äy Rabbıbız, onıtılıp yäki hata belän kılgan (gönahlarıbız) öçen cäza birmä. Äy Rabbıbız, bezdän äüväl yäşägännärgä birgän kebek bezgä avırlıklar birmä. Äy Rabbıbız, bezgä kütärä almaslık eşlär yöklämä. Bezne afu it, bezgä magfiräteñne häm rahmäteñne bir. Sin bezneñ Hucabız, bezne köferlek kıluçılardan sakla.

— Ramil Belyaev, Ramazan ayätläre I

==== Names ====
Tatar names are mostly of Arabic, Persian and Turkic origin. Tatars who settled in the country usually adopted their patronymic as a surname. (Example: Hakimov = Son of Hakim.) However, Tatars who traveled together with their father adopted their father's patronymic; in other words, their grandfather's name. Due to this, brothers who traveled at a different time might have ended up using a different surname. These Russian suffixes were mostly removed from their names during the time of Finnish independence (1917). It is speculated that with this, they tried to avoid the negative attitudes the Finns had towards Russians at the time. In Russia, some Tatars have used their surname without such a suffix as well, though usually in unofficial terms, such as an artist name. (Ğabdulla Tuqayev – Ğabdulla Tuqay).

Until early to mid 1900s, given names were often two part (Hamidulla, Gölbanu), or in general were Quranic (Ahmed, Hamide).

Later (second half of the 1900s and into the 2000s), names are often either Turkish (Erkan, Meral), or Turkic-Persian/Arabic hybrids (Ildar, Aynur).

The sound [æ], which is abundant in Tatar language, appears often marked with either A or E in Finland. (Cyrillic Ә in Russia - Latin script: Ä or Ə). In general, the spelling of Tatar names in the country varies a lot.

=== Art ===
==== Music ====
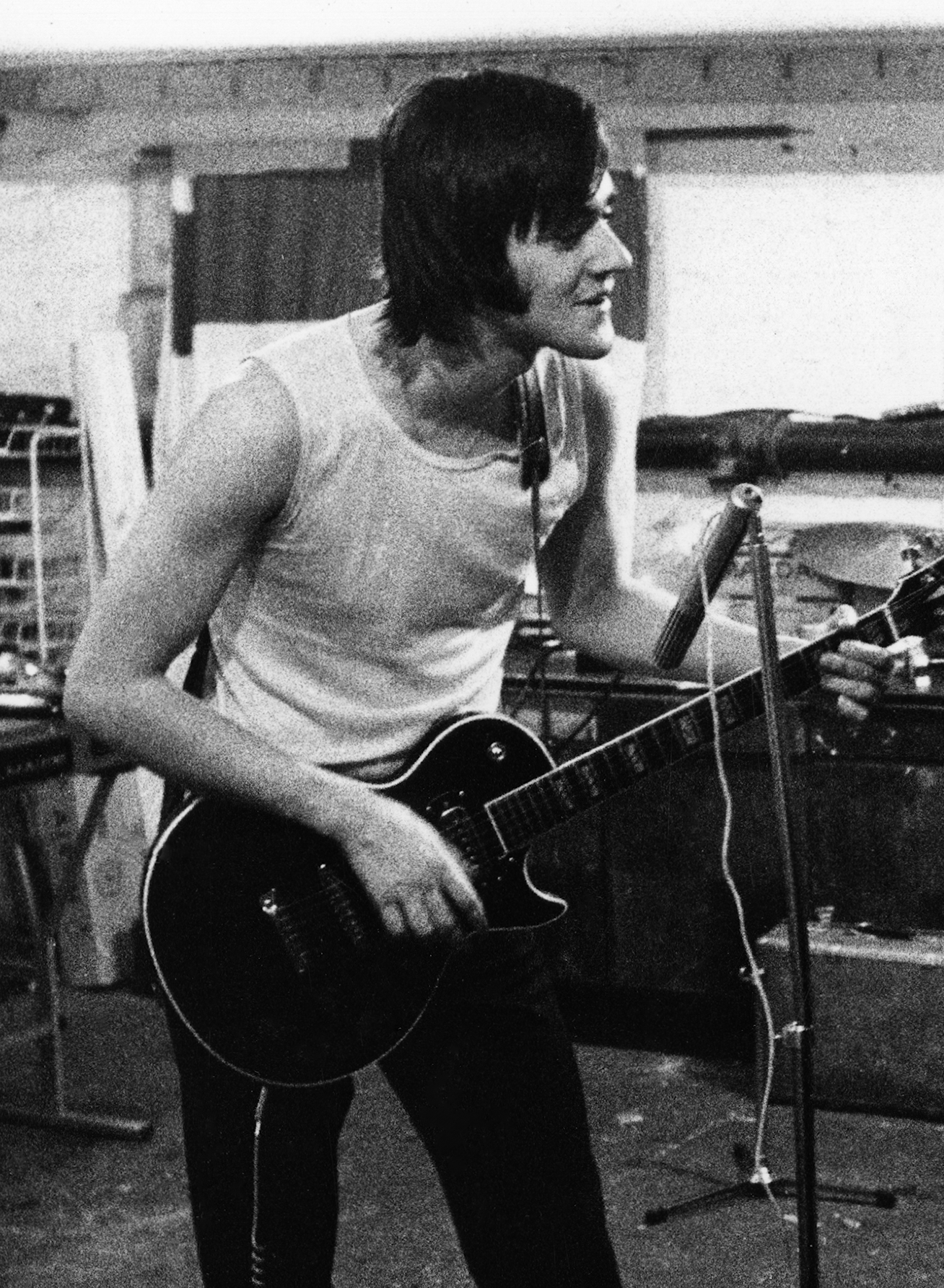
Deniz Bedretdin, the frontman of Finnish Tatar ensemble Başkarma, early 1970s.

The musical tradition, which is largely based on old folk songs, originates from Nizhny Novgorod Oblast, where the first generation was born. Often in Tatar folk music, there is a longing for home and relatives left behind. Musical style called "dance song" (tanssilaulu in Finnish) however is described as "rhythmic, brisk and happy". Modern Tatar music in Finland has been represented by the local ensemble Başkarma, whose frontman Deniz Bedretdin has founded two other bands in Kazan and in 1968 in Helsinki established the "first Tatar rock band" called The Sounds of Tsingiskhan.

Tatars in Finland have had their own choirs. Talented singers among the community have been especially Hamit Hairedin, Zeituna Abdrahim, Naim Sadik, Hamdurrahman Hakimcan, Aliye Hakimcan, Hamide Çaydam, Dina Abdul, and Betül Hairetdin. Musicians include Halid Kurbanali, Batu Alkara, and Ädhäm Kanykoff (who was a close friend of Finnish composer Jean Sibelius).

Ever since the 1960s, Russian Tatar musicians have performed among the community. First ones to come were Röstäm Yäxin, İlham Şakirov, Venera Şäripova, Ayrat Arslanov, Marat Äxmätov, and Mars Makarov. The trip was arranged by cultural worker Ymär Daher. Together they performed in Helsinki and Tampere and during this time met Finnish president Urho Kekkonen.

==== Poetry ====
Mishar poetry is often described as wistful. Most prominent Finnish Tatar poet was Sadretdin "Sadri" Hamid (1905–1987), whose speciality was humorous and rhyming chronicles. Female poet Gäühär Tuganay (1911–1998) was known for her nature-themed poetry. Aisa Hakimcan wrote often about his longing for home village Aktuk. Imam Habiburrahman Shakir and publisher Hasan Hamidulla expressed themselves through poetry as well.

Fazile Nasretdin's Tuksan tugız haiku (Ninety-nine haiku), the first ever Tatar language haiku collection (according to researched Sabira Stahlberg) was published for free on website Aybagar in 2022. It includes an English version as well.

The national Volga Tatar poet Ğabdulla Tuqay (Abdulla Tukay for Mishars) is held in high regard among the community. Yearly celebrations in his name are held, a cultural association named after him established and publications honoring him published.

==== Theater ====
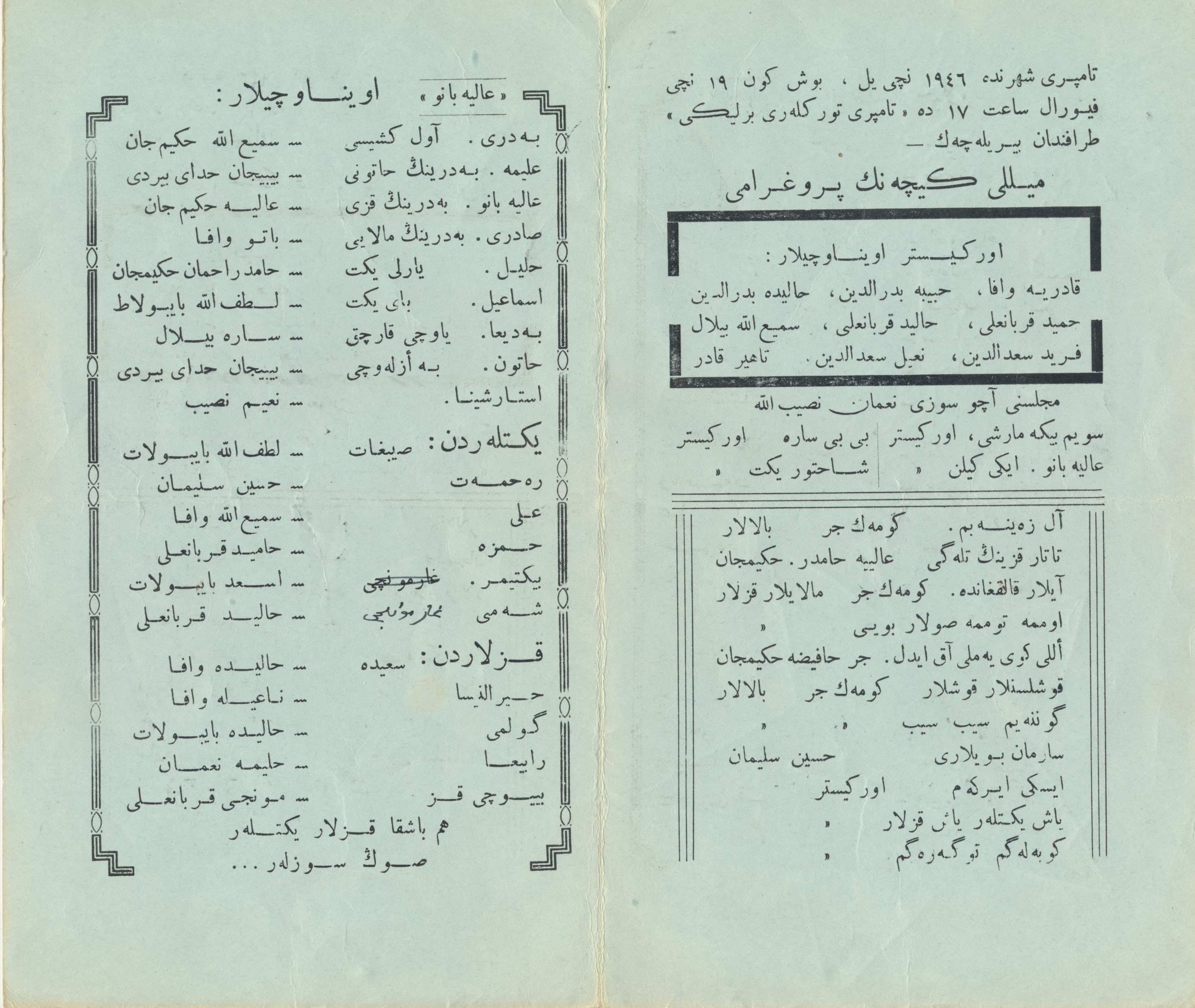
Handbill of a theater play "Aliyebanu", performed by Tampere Tatars in Helsinki, 1946.

The community in Finland has organized their own theater plays. The most active period was during the 1900s in Helsinki and Tampere. Some of the more larger shows were especially in the Tampere Theatre, to where at best, over 300 Finnish Tatars per show were invited. Political refugees such as Musa Bigiev and Ayaz Ishaki were present at times as well.

The first Tatar play in the country was in 1930. It was Ğäliyäbanu by playwright Mirxäydär Fäyzi (known as Mir-Hayder Feyzi and Aliyebanu in Finland). Other plays include for example Fäyzi's Asıl Yar, Zöleyha by Ayaz Ishaki, Bülek öçın, Bırınçı teater and Behıtsız Yıgıt by Ğäliäsğar Kamal. The Tatars of Helsinki performed Molière's The Miser in Tampere during the 1950s. The community has also performed abroad, such as in Estonia, Russia (Kazan), and New York. Russian Tatar artist Luara Şakircanova directed plays in Helsinki during the 1990s. Kazan Tatar Saniye İffet (Сания Гыйффәт, Saniyä Ğiffät; 1899–1957) wrote some plays while living in Finland in the late 1930s.

==== Design ====
Design artists among the community include jewelry designer Ildar Wafin (b. 1995), whose earrings the spouse of the president of Finland Jenni Haukio wore during the Independence Day Reception in 2018. Architect Pervin Imaditdin is known especially for her hotel and restaurant designs. Visual and textile designer Niran Baibulat was awarded in 2007 for her work.

=== Cuisine ===
The cuisine tradition of Finnish Tatars consists mainly of different types of soups, meat based foods, sweet and savory dough based foods, pies, pilaf and porridges. The most known Tatar food in Finland is the spicy pastry called pärämäç (pärämätsi among the Finns). It was commercialized by a Finnish Tatar chef/hockey player Mönäyvär Saadetdin in Tampere during the 1960s.

A traditional cuisine among the Finnish Tatars is also for example a sausage made from horsemeat, named kazı.

=== Publishing ===
Publishing work among the relatively small community of Tatars has been abundant. Given activity can be divided as such: history, memoirs, biographies, poetry, proverbs, music, religious literature, Tatar language textbooks, children's books and magazines.

The most active Finnish Tatar publisher was Hasan Hamidulla. His notable works include a historic on the Tatar village Aktuk / Yañapar (Yañapar tarihı). In 2026, this was translated to English by Sabira Stahlberg and Fazile Nasretdin.

Entrepreneur Zinnetullah Ahsen Böre published the first Finnish language Quran.

In 2016, a Tatar-Finnish-dictionary was published by cultural influencer Okan Daher and a Finnish researcher Arto Moisio.

=== Celebrations ===
Traditional celebrations among the Tatar community include an every spring celebration of poet Abdulla Tukay named Balalar Bäyräme (Children's celebration), where the children and teenagers of the community perform songs, poems and stories. During the summer, camps are held for the young. For a long time, until 2020, the location was Kirkkonummi. In the early days the camps lasted a month, today it's ten days. The camp ends in the Tatar festival Sabantuy.

== Population ==
Finnish Tatars are officially one of the seven national minority groups in the country.

=== Ethnic composition ===
The Finnish Tatars are Mishars, and thus, Volga Tatars. The ethnic formation of Mishar Tatars has no consensus and their culture has been influenced by for example Russian and Mordvan tradition. The Mishars in Finland were also influenced by Turkish culture during the 1900s. Researchers such as Antero Leitzinger and Alimdzhan Orlov have stated, that while features of many different so called foreign influences can be found in Mishar culture, are they still one of the "purest representatives" of ancient Turkic Kipchaks today.

As of 2020, the community consists approximately 600-700 members. Most Tatars live in the cities of Helsinki, Tampere, Turku, and Järvenpää.

The Tatars themselves generally think they have conserved their cultural identity very well, but at the same time, worries about its future and assimilation have been raised.

The first generation of Finnish Tatars (born in the late 1800s on average) consisted of approximately 160 families, of which two thirds married within their people. Already among the earliest generation there were mixed marriages between Finnish women and Tatar men. These women converted to Islam and usually learned to communicate in Tatar. Such cases were accepted as exceptions though, since traditionally mixed marriages are thought of negatively among the community, so much so that during the 1900s, it might have left the child without parental inheritance. Some Tatar men have found a wife among the Russian Tatars, but most marriages are between the Finns now. The younger generations have expressed having difficulties finding a spouse among the small community.

== Sports ==
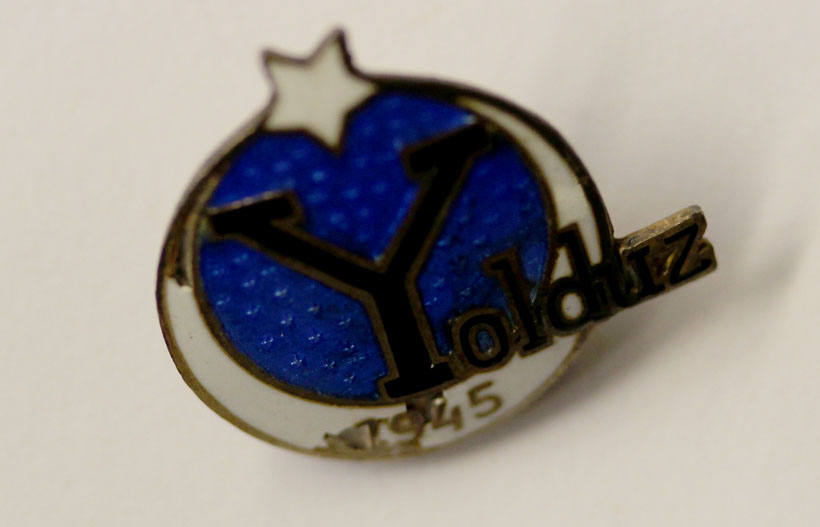
Pin of a Finnish Tatar sports team "Yolduz", 1945

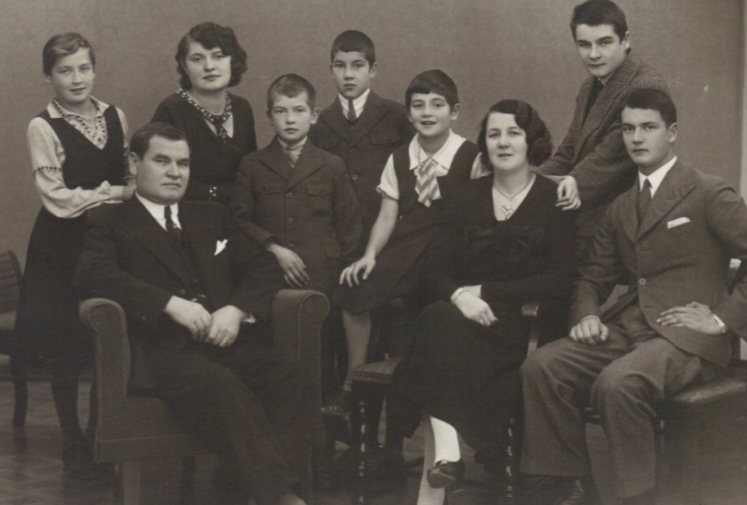
Ahsen-Böre family

Tatars have been represented in different professional sports in Finland, especially in ice hockey. They have also established their own sports teams. Originally, the first generation encouraged their children to take part in sports at their new environment. Sports had been an important part of their every summer Sabantuy -celebrations in their home villages.

Among the more meritorious Tatar athletes are footballer Atik Ismail, ice hockey players Lotfi Nasib and Räshid Hakimsan.

Brothers Feyzi, Murat, Zeyd, and Vasif Ahsen-Böre all played ice hockey in the 1930s and 1940s. Ali and his brother Mönäyvär Saadetdin played for Ilves, as did the brother of Lotfi Nasib, Naim, and his son, Erkan Nasib.

More recent Tatar athletes include basketball player Meral Bedretdin (b. 1993).

== Finnish Tatar establishments ==
- Helsingin musulmaanien hyväntekeväisyysseura (1915)
- Suomen muhamettilainen seurakunta (1925, later the Finnish-Islamic Congregation, Finlandiya Islam Cemaatı)
- Suomalais-turkkilaisen kansakoulun kannatusyhdistys (Fin-Türk halkmektebin himaye cemiyeti, 1930)
- Suomen turkkilaisten seura (Finlandiya Türkleri Bırlıgı, 1935)
- Tampereen Turkkilainen Yhdistys (Tampere Türkleri Bırlıgı, 1935)
- Tampereen Islamilainen Yhdistys (1935)
- Tampereen Islamilainen Seurakunta (1943, Tampere Islam Mahallesı)
- Turun Turkkilais-Tataarilainen Yhdistys (1938, later. Turun turkkilainen yhdistys)
- Jalkapalloseura Altın Orda (Golden Orda)
- Urheiluseura Yolduz (Yolduz = Star, 1945)
- Turkkilaisen kansakoulun kannatusyhdistys (1948, Türk Halk Mektebi Himaye Kurumu)
- Abdulla Tukain kulttuuriseura (1968)

== Connections to Turkey ==
The Finnish Tatar community has maintained their relationship with Turkey ever since the 1920s. The community has been visited for example by Turkish president (Prime Minister at the time) Recep Tayyip Erdoğan, who during his trip conveyed how impressed he was that such a small Turkic community had been able to conserve their tradition. Previous president of Turkey, Abdullah Gül paid a visit before this as well. In the congregation there has also been some imams from Turkey.

Turkish network TRT filmed a documentary on the Finnish Tatar community in 2005 called "Finlandiya Tatarları".

A Turkish translation of a history book about the Finnish Tatars, by Dr. Ramil Belyaev, imam of the Finnish Islamic Congregation, was published in Ankara in October 2024. The publication was also attended by President Alexander Stubb. In connection with the matter, Erdoğan stated that "Turkish citizens living in Finland, together with the country's Tatars, form an important human dimension of our relations."

== Notable Finnish Tatars ==
- Abdullah Ali - businessman, leader
- Ymär Abdrahim - merchant, shopkeeper
- Hasan Abdrahim - speed skater
- Zinnetullah Ahsen Böre - merchant, publisher
- Feyzi Ahsen-Böre - hockey player
- Niran Baibulat - visual and textile designer
- Deniz Bedretdin - musician, composer, producer, manager
- Meral Bedretdin - basketball player
- Ramil Belyaev - imam of the Finnish-Islamic Congregation
- Hamide Çaydam - Tatar language teacher
- Ymär Daher - cultural worker, deputy judge, doctor of philosophy, docent of Turkology
- Okan Daher - honorary president of the Finnish-Islamic Congregation, cultural worker
- Aisa Hakimcan - artist, leader, publisher
- Räshid Hakimsan - hockey player, referee
- Weli-Ahmed Hakim - imam
- Hasan Hamidulla - writer, publisher, businessman
- Jasmin Hamid - actress, politician, investor
- Sadri Hamid - poet, publisher
- Pervin Imaditdin - architect
- Adil Ismail - footballer, handball player
- Atik Ismail - footballer
- Hasan Kanykoff - merchant, political activist
- Halid Kurbanali - musician
- Gibadulla Murtasin - teacher, leader, artist
- Lotfi Nasib - hockey player
- Fazile Nasretdin - poet, translator
- Räshid Nasretdin - photographer
- Ismail Neuman - baseball player
- Cemile Nisametdin - artist, musician, actress
- Ymär Sali - merchant, shopkeeper, businessman, leader, entrepreneur
- Mönäyvär Saadetdin - hockey player, commercializer of peremech in Finland
- Batu Samaletdin - publisher
- Habiburrahman Shakir - imam, theologian, publisher
- Sabira Ståhlberg - writer, researcher
- Gäühär Tuganay - poet
- Vahit Wafin - entrepreneur, chairman of the Tampere Tatar Congregation
- Tinet Wafin - entrepreneur (carpet shop Mattocenter with husband Vahit)
- Ildar Wafin - jewelry designer
- Semiulla Wafin - shopkeeper, leader, publisher, teacher

== See also ==
- Tatars
- Volga Tatars
- Mishar Tatars
- Mishar Tatar dialect
- Tatar language
- Tatar alphabet
- Tatar name
- Turks in Finland
- Islam in Finland
- The Finnish-Islamic Congregation
- The Tampere Islamic Congregation
- Järvenpää mosque
- List of first generation Finnish Tatar names

== Sources ==
- Asikainen, Johannes: Tataareja, kasakoita, vai muslimeja?. Tampere: Tampereen Yliopisto, 2017. Trepo
- Bedretdin, Kadriye (editor): Tugan Tel – Kirjoituksia Suomen Tataareista. Helsinki: Suomen Itämainen Seura, 2011. ISBN 978-951-9380-78-0.
- Baibulat, Muazzez: Tampereen Islamilainen Seurakunta: juuret ja historia. Jyväskylä: Gummerus Kirjapaino Oy, 2004. ISBN 952-9167539.
- Halikov, A. H.: Tataarit, keitä te olette?. Suom. Lauri Kotiniemi. Abdulla Tukain kulttuuriseura, 1991. ISBN 952-9031149.
- Leitzinger, Antero: Mishäärit – Suomen vanha islamilainen yhteisö. (Sisältää Hasan Hamidullan "Yañaparin historian", suomentanut ja kommentoinnut Fazile Nasretdin). Helsinki: Kirja-Leitzinger, 1996. ISBN 952-9752083.
- Leitzinger, Antero: Suomen tataarit - Vuosina 1968-1944 muodostuneen muslimiyhteisön menestystarina. East-West Books, Helsinki 2006. ISBN 952-99592-2-2
- Suikkanen, Mikko: Yksityinen susi – Zinnetullah Ahsen Bören (1886–1945) eletty ja koettu elämä. Historian pro gradu -tutkielma. Tampere: Tampereen yliopisto, 2012. Trepo.
- Tervonen, Miikka & Leinonen Johanna (editor.): Vähemmistöt muuttajina - Näkökulmia suomalaisen muuttoliikehistorian moninaisuuteen. Painosalama Oy, Turku 2021. ISBN 978-952-7399-09-5.
