= List of first generation Finnish Tatar names =

This is a list of first generation Finnish Tatar names.

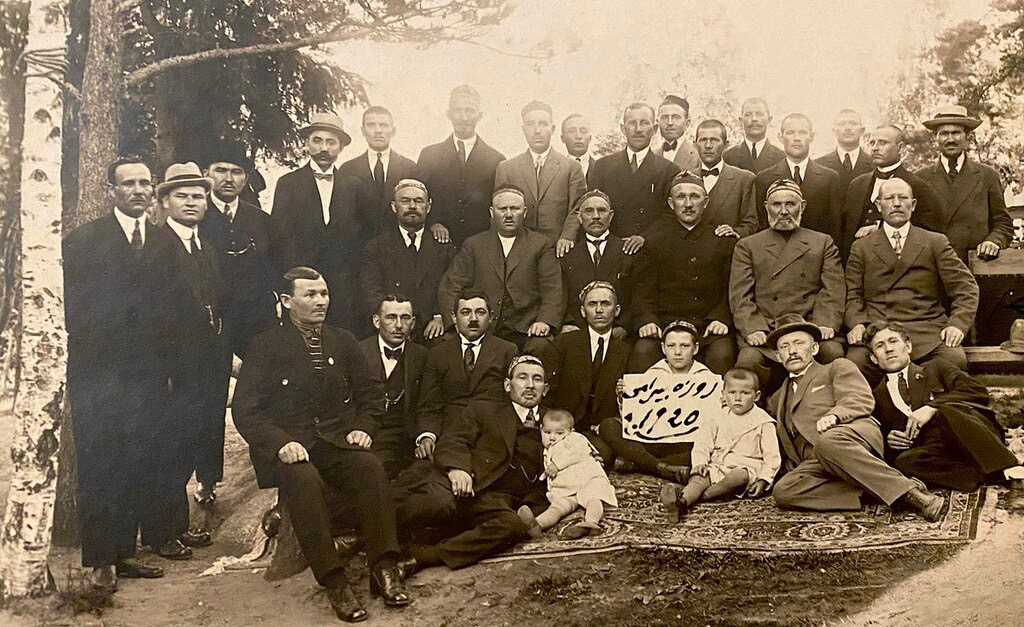
Tatars in Helsinki. (1920).

The list contains Mishar Tatar males, who were born in the villages of Nizhny Novgorod Oblast (then Governorate), Sergachsky District, and settled in Finland as merchants in late 1800s and early 1900s. Most of them were from Aktuk.

Current Finnish Tatars are their descendants and to this day majority of them live in Helsinki and after that in Tampere, Järvenpää and Turku.

The spelling of the names varies greatly and same names are often written in alternative versions in another sources. Russian suffixes, which then marked a patronym, were usually removed around the time of independence of Finland (1917).

== A ==
- Abdrahim, Ymär (1882–1975)
- Abdulkerimoff, Şamaletdin (1887–1933)
- Ahmedshan, Hairetdin (1884–?)
- Aimadetdin, Zinnetullah (Ahsen Böre; 1886–1945), Abdullah (Ahsen; 1888–1949), Abdulhak (Imaditdin; 1891–1944)
- Aimadetdin, Fattah (1878–1962)
- Aimaletdin, Aisatulla (1881–1928)
- Aimaletdin, Kemaletdin (1888–1960)
- Ainetdin, Bilaletdin (Kaader; 1885–1959), Ahmedshan (Saadetdin; 1893–1955)
- Ainetdin, Abdulla (1887–1947), Meyletdin (1875–1950), Sadik (1886–1957)
- Ainulla, Idiatulla (1898–1971)
- Akbulat, Salahetdin (1881–1961)
- Alautdin, Ymär (Sali; 1876–1951), Abdulla (1886–1935)
- Ali, Hairedin (1868–1943), Ymär (1872–1957), Besher (1876–1956)
- Ali, Kafiatulla (1858–1926)
- Alimoff, Abdulkebir (1874–1947)
- Arifdshan, Mahmud (1888–1950)
- Arifullen, Sadri (1894–1966), Ibrahim (Arifulla; 1901–1955)
- Arifullen / Arifulla, Ismail (1882–1963), Safer (1897–1964)
- Arifulla, Samaletdin (1875–1939)
- Arifulla, Sarif (Toktamesh; 1883–1964)
- Arifullen, Bedretdin (1876–1933)
- Asis, Abdullah (1876–1939)
- Asis, Ishak (1884–1956)
- Asis, Mirjakub (1886–1964)

== B ==
- Badautdin / Badaudin, Hasan (1881–1968)
- Baibulat, Kemal (1871–1950)
- Baibulat, Samaletdin (1872–1957)
- Bavautdin, Bedi (1878–1954), Husnetdin (Abdrasak; 1879–1963)
- Bedretdin, Fedjahetdin (1874–1934), Feshetdin (1884–1965), Fehretdin (1888–1959), Mustafa (1894–1963), Abdullah (1898–1951)
- Bedretdin, Husainshah (Sali; 1898–?), Burhan (?–1929)
- Bedretdin, Minashetdin (1887–1948)
- Bedretdin, Abbas (1895–1967)
- Bedretdin / Bederdin, Afzaletdin (1880–1947)
- Bedretdin / Bederdin, Ymär (Talus; 1888–1967)
- Bedretdin, Sadri (Hamid; 1905–1987)
- Beshar, Imametdin (1881–1939), Aisa (1886–1941)
- Bilaletdin, Abdulgafur (1890–1956), Abdulgaffar (1892–?)
- Bilaletdin, Samaletdin (1891–1960)
- Bilaletdin, Şelaletdin (1880–1933)

== D ==
- Daher, Sarif (1884–1959)
- Devlethan, Aisa (1881–1941)

== E ==
- Eksan, Bilaletdin (1887–1961)

== F ==
- Fethulla, Husein (Fathullah; 1877–1962), Suleiman (Fenel; 1891–1971)
- Fethulla, Yakub (Fathullah; 1879–1971)
- Fethulla, Kamal (1879–1964)
- Fähretdin, Nuretdin (Fere; 1892–1942)

== G ==
- Gubeidulla, Osman (?–1931), Hodaybirdi (Alkara; 1888–1969)

== H ==
- Hairetdin / Hairedin, Abdulhai (1907–1957), Abdulhamid (1913–?)
- Hairetdin, Alautdin (1869–1928)
- Hairetdin, Fazlulla (1880–1955)
- Hairetdin, Kafiatulla (1875–1947)
- Hairetdin, Salahetdin (1881–1960)
- Hairulla, Zinnetulla (1892–1965), Hamze (1907–?)
- Hakim, Veli Ahmed (1882–1970)
- Hakimdshan, Ibrahim (1880–1962), Siddik (Hakimsan; 1880–1961), Aisa (Hakimsan; 1896–1972)
- Hamidulla, Nisametdin (1863–1940), Hisametdin (1864–1949)
- Hamidulla / Hamidullen, Mustafa (1883–1943)
- Hasan, Husein (1879–1928), Samaletdin (1880–1934)
- Hasan, Bilaletdin (1874–1948)
- Hisametdin, Abdraham (1886–1953)
- Hudaibirdi, Ahmedshan (1876–1954)
- Husnetdin, Hasan (1880–1948)

== I ==
- Ibrahim, Ismail (1884–1965)
- Imametdin, Amirdshan (1891–?)
- Imametdin, Salahetdin (1899–1974)
- Ismail, Mustafa (1864–?), Safa (1869–1941)
- Issatulla, Hasan (1900–?), Mustafa (1906–?)

== J ==
- Josipov, Hamze (1877–1947)
- Josipov, Abdulla (1892–1965)
- Josepoff, Sadik (1896–1964)

== K ==
- Kafiatulla, Ymär (1895–1960)
- Kanykoff, Silaletdin (1866–1930), Hasan (1880–1954)
- Korbangali, Mirsiaf (1882–1967), Ymär (Kurbanali; 1888–1957)

== M ==
- Muhamedin, Cemaletdin (Osman; 1890–1952)
- Muhamedshan, Ahmedshan (1886–1970)
- Muhammadieff, Seifetdin (Osman; 1895–1978)

== N ==
- Nasibulla / Nasibullen, Neuman (1890–1966), Abduldeyyin (Karatau; 1893–1953), Ymär (1895–1964)
- Nasretdin, Fähretdin (1890–1954)
- Neuman, Husein (1885–1956)
- Nisametdin, Muhetdin (1874–1936)
- Nisametdin, Safiullah (1874–1945)

== R ==
- Rahmatulla, Ahmedshan (1877–?), Hamze (1886–1944)

== S ==
- Saadetdin, Bedretdin (1878–1966), Hairetdin (1882–1950)
- Saber, Sadik (1885–?), Abdulkabir (1888–1944), Sjöfär (Sabir; 1897–1942)
- Sadik, Halilulla (1866–?), Aisa (1876–1949), Suleiman (1883–1961)
- Sadik, Bilaletdin (1865–1947)
- Sadik, Yusuf (1867–1931)
- Sadik, Idiatulla (1872–1950)
- Sadik, Siddik (1886–1945)
- Sadri, Semiulla (1885–1955)
- Salah, Mustafa (1886–1960)
- Salavat, Alautdin (1860–1930), Osman (1877–?)
- Sali, Safiulla (Tashbulat; 1893–1971)
- Samaletdin, Imadetdin (1880–1967), Letfulla (1883–1920), Ahmedshan (1886–1955), Hasan (1891–1960)
- Samarhan, Hairetdin (1878–1929)
- Samlihan, Kemaletdin (1884–1947)
- Schakir / Şakir, Husein (1881–1950), Hairulla (1889–1955), Abdulla (1900–1983)
- Schakir, Safa (1872–1952)
- Schamaletdin / Şamaletdin, Mustafa (1887–1954), Zeynülbeshar (1889–1954)
- Schamaletdin, Celaletdin (Taschbulat; 1878–1959)
- Seifetdin, Bilaletdin (1886–1937)
- Seifulla, Husein (1881–1985)
- Sekam, Abdulkuddus (1880–1947)
- Siaetdin, Ismail (1887–1936)
- Siaetdin, Abdulla (1889–1947)
- Suleiman, Husein (1904–?)

== T ==
- Toktamesh, Ibrahim (1897–1979)
- Tuganay, Hakim (1902–1983)

== V ==
- Vahid, Hairetdin (1876–1945)
- Virgas, Osman (1872–?)

== W ==
- Wafin, Zinnetulla (1886–1941)

== Others ==
Other Muslim migrants, who either assimilated to the Tatar community or mixed with the Finnish people.

- Akinskij, Ali Sader
- Alibek, Velibek (Lezgi)
- Alizade, Mahmud (Azeri)
- Bedeutdin, Safa
- Hairetdin / Hairedin, Schakir
- Halikoff, Abdurrahman
- Hamido, Toivo (Avar)
- Kenschahmet, Ömmet (Kazakh)
- Mohammed, Abdülber (Kazan Tatar)
- Murtazin, Gibadulla (Central Asian)
- Osman, Ismirza (Kazakh)
- Rami, Arif (Kazan Tatar)
- Riza, Ismail (Azeri)
- Sadik-Ogli, Rahim (Azeri)
- Sarijeff / Sarmavuo, Haciahmed
- Schakir, Habibur-Rahman (Kazan Tatar)
- Selimgerei, Iskender (Kazan Tatar)
- Tahir, Zuhur (Uzbek)
- Taschitdin, Vildan (Kazan Tatar)

== See also ==
- Tatar language
- Tatar alphabet

== Sources ==
- Leitzinger, Antero: Mishäärit - Suomen vanha islamilainen yhteisö. Kirja-Leitzinger, 1996, Helsinki. ISBN 952-9752-08-3.
- Bedretdin, Kadriye: Tugan Tel: Kirjoituksia Suomen tataareista. Suomen Itämainen Seura, 2011, Helsinki. ISBN 978-951-9380-78-0.
