= Ymär Abdrahim =

Russian-Finnish merchant

Ymär Abdrahim Умяр Абдрахим Гомәр Габдрәхим
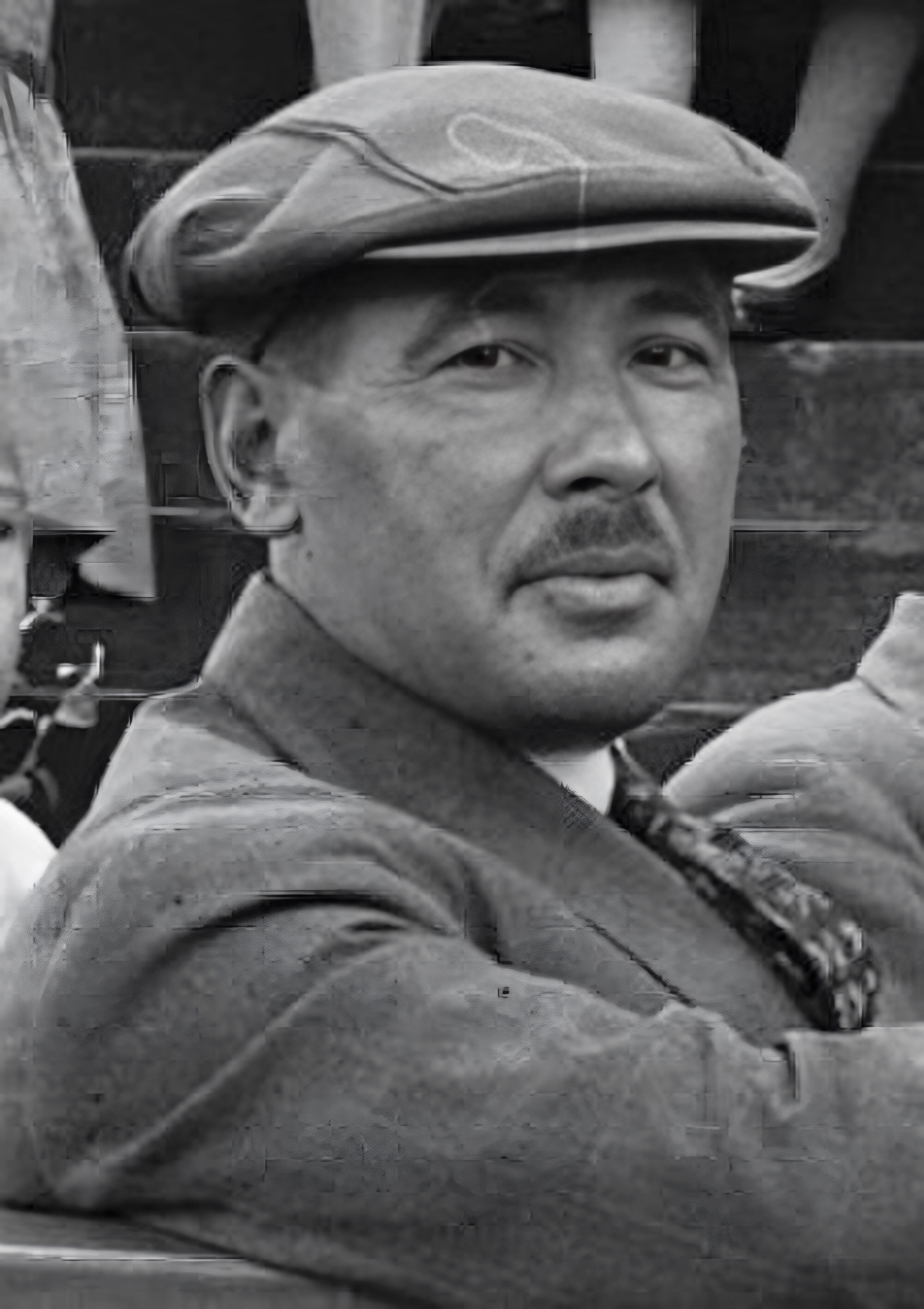
- Abdrahim in 1927.
- Born: Умяр Абдрахимов; 24 March 1882; Nizhny Novgorod Governorate, Russian Empire
- Died: 26 March 1975 (aged 93); Finland

Ymär Abdrahim (né Abdrahimoff - Russian: Умяр Абдрахимов, romanized: Umyar Abdrahimov; Mishar Dialect: "Ümär", Literary Tatar: Гомәр Габдрәхимов, Ğomär Ğabdräximov; 24 March 1882 - 26 March 1975) was a Tatar entrepreneur, who had his own successful haberdashery/fabric shop in Helsinki.

== Life ==
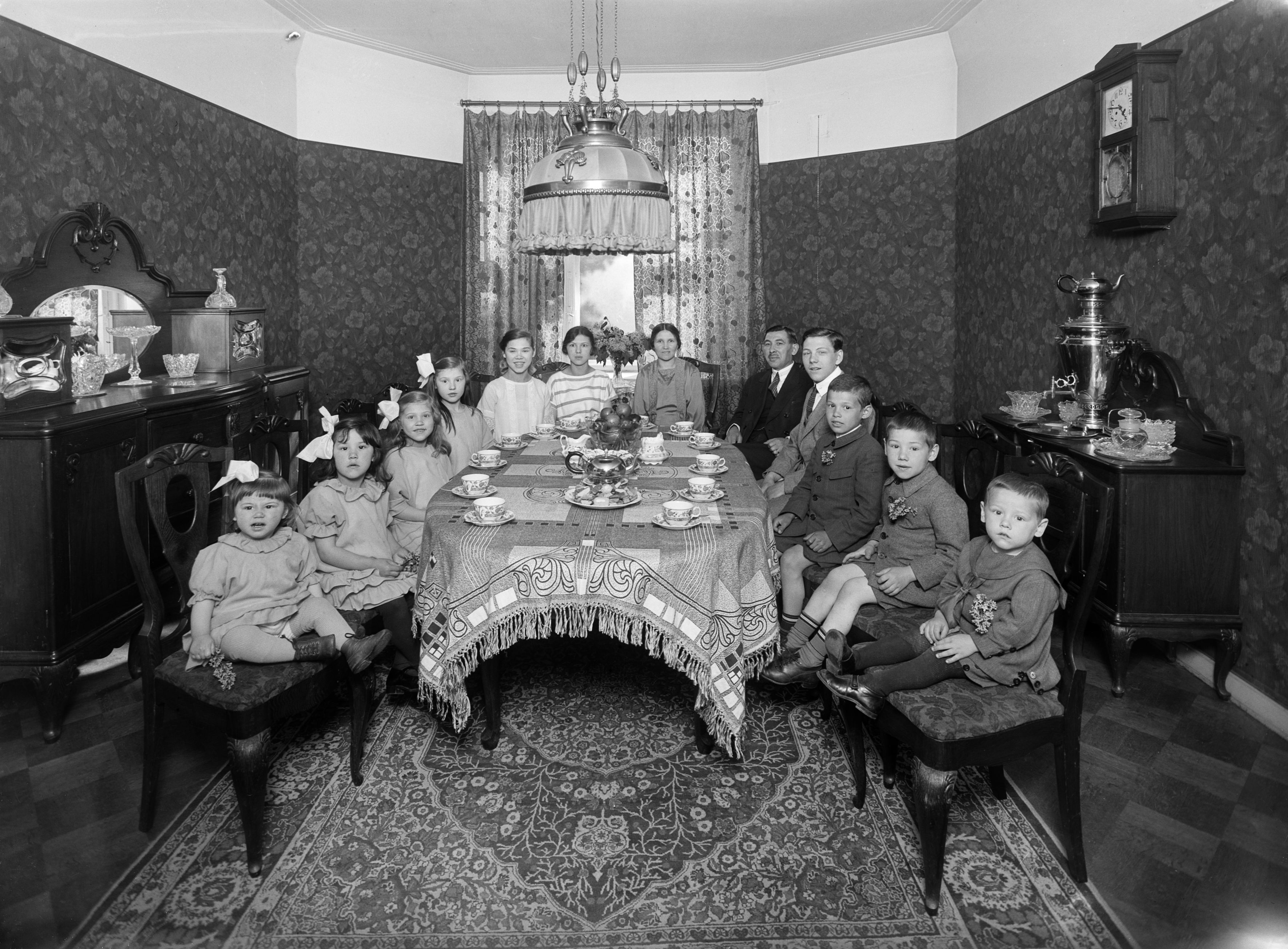
The Abdrahim family, 1925

Ymär Abdrahim (Ümär Abdrahimoff) was born in Russian Empire, Nizhny Novgorod Governorate. Abdrahim opened his own haberdashery/fabric shop in 1911. It was located in Punavuori, Helsinki. Before this, Abdrahim's uncle had already had business in the city.

Abdrahim was also involved in the forming of The Finnish-Islamic Congregation.

After he got married and obtained Finnish citizenship, he brought his family to Finland. He had fourteen children in total, of which some had been born in Russia, others in Finland. He had them with two women, the first one died due to an illness. Six of Abdrahim's children fought for Finland in World War II: sons Osman and Hasan on the front, daughters Fazie, Hatime, Safiye and Sadri as food and medicine Lottas. Hasan died at war. As a civilian, Osman was for example a chairman of a Tatar sportsclub called Yolduz and also an honorary member of The Finnish-Islamic Congregation.

Ymär Abdrahim is buried in the Islamic Cemetery in Helsinki.

Ğomər Ğabdrəxim / Umyar Abdrahimov
Bulat Şəymi, Kazan 2023.

== Literature ==
- Bedretdin, Kadriye (reporter): Tugan Tel: Kirjoituksia Suomen Tataareista. Suomen Itämainen Seura, Helsinki 2011. ISBN 978-951-9380-78-0.
