= Jasmin Hamid =

Finnish actress and politician (born 1984)

Jasmin Hamid (born 18 February 1984, Helsinki) is a Finnish actress, politician and investor.

== Biography ==
As an actress, Hamid is most known for playing a character named Katariina Mäkelä in the popular Finnish television soap opera Salatut elämät. Hamid has a master's degree in acting. She began her studies as a teenager on a dancing program and continued in theater university during 2003–2008.

Hamid started her career in politics in 2008, when she ran during the Helsinki local elections, representing the Green League. She was then chosen as deputy commissioner. In 2012, she was chosen for the Helsinki council with 1,200 votes.

Hamid got into investing in 2013, when she bought her first investment housing in Kallio, Helsinki. Hamid has been vocal in the media about the fact that while investors are often portrayed as "suited-up professionals", investing actually is possible for others as well - encouraging people to start investing somewhere.

Hamid is a part of the Finnish Tatar community. She has two children with her Finnish husband Santtu Hulkkonen. Hamid speaks Tatar to her children.
