= Sergachsky Uyezd =

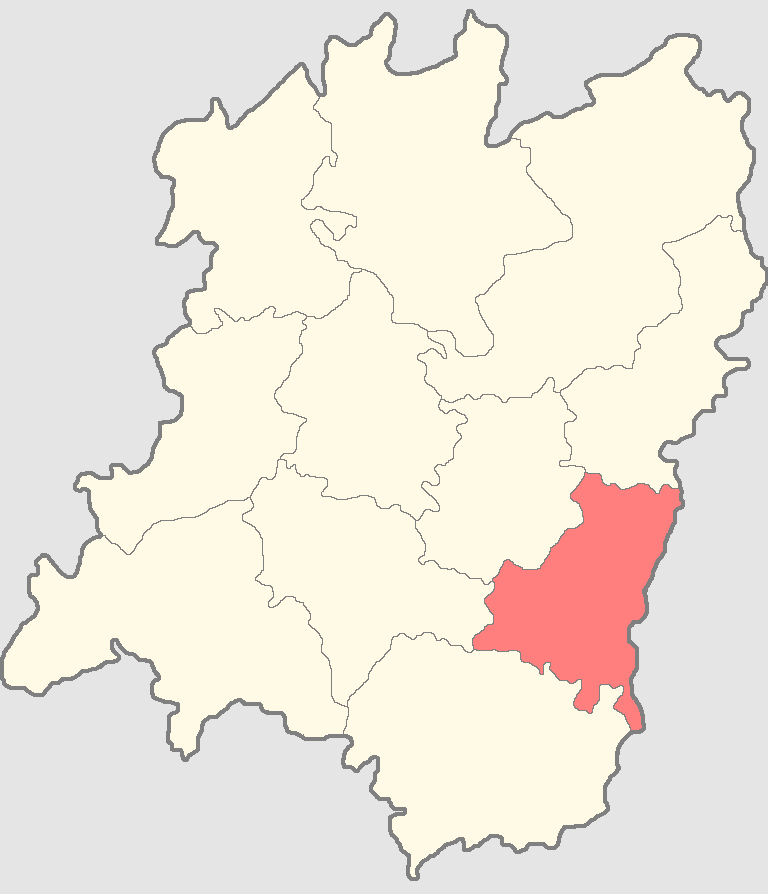
Sergach Uyezd on the map of Nizhny Novgorod Governorate

Sergachsky Uyezd (Сергачский уезд) was one of the subdivisions of the Nizhny Novgorod Governorate of the Russian Empire. It was situated in the southeastern part of the governorate. Its administrative centre was Sergach.

== Demographics ==
At the time of the Russian Empire Census of 1897, Sergachsky Uyezd had a population of 159,117. Of these, 73.8% spoke Russian, 17.1% Tatar and 8.9% Mordvin as their native language.
