= Semiulla Wafin =

Finnish Tatar community leader (1909–1983)

- Сәмигулла Вафин سميع الله وفا
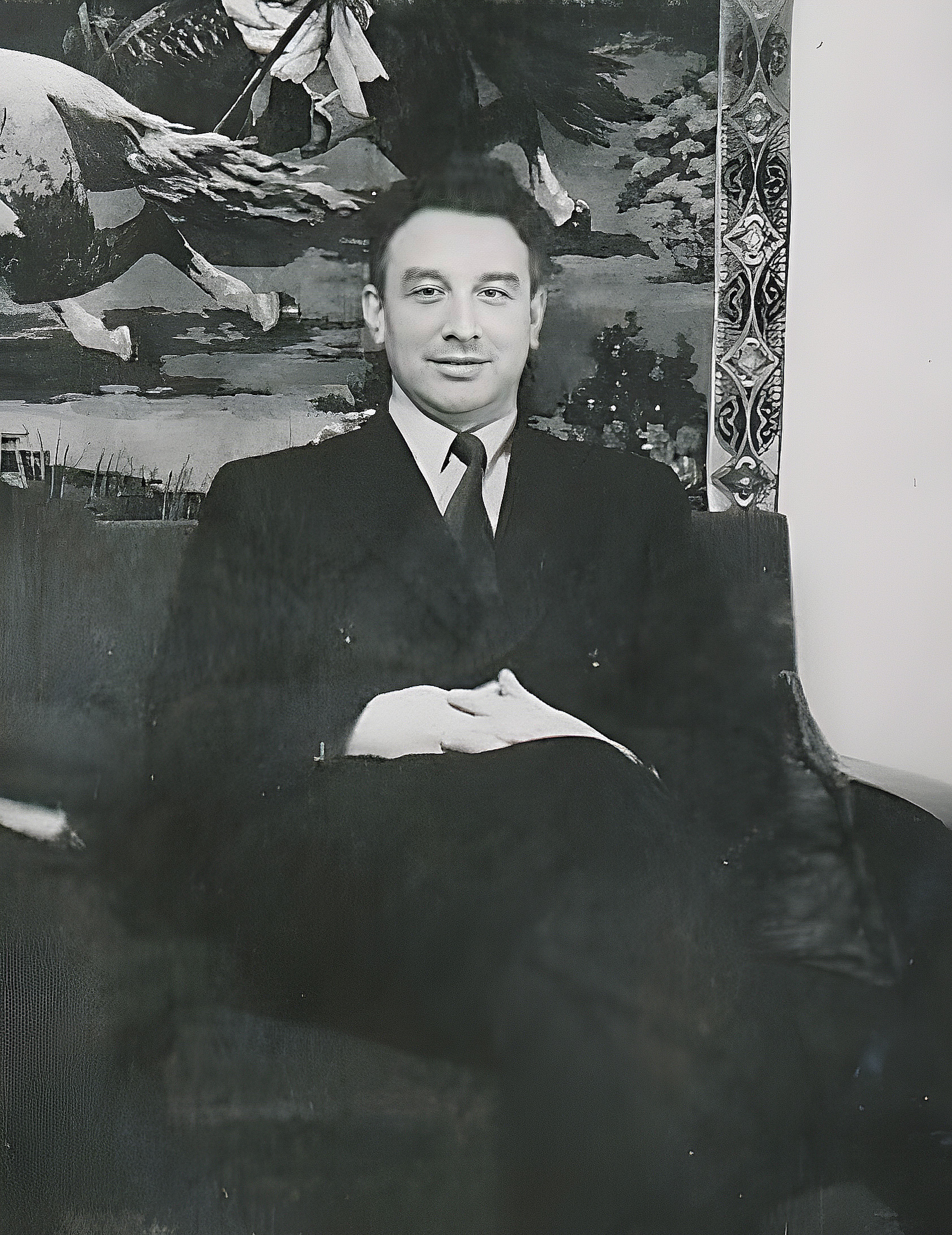
- Wafin c. 1950
- Born: 2 February 1909; Aktuk, Sergachsky District, Nizhny Novgorod Oblast, Russian Empire
- Died: 18 December 1983 (aged 74); Tampere, Finland
- Other name: Semiulla Vafa
- Spouse: Mahrusa Allayarı
- Children: 3
- Relatives: Ildar Wafin (great-grandson)

Semiulla Wafin (also Vafa; İske imlâ: سميع الله وفا, Tatar: Сәмигулла Вафин / Вафа, romanized: Səmiğulla Wafin / Wafa; 2 February 1909 – 18 December 1983) was a Finnish Tatar businessman, community leader, and cultural figure. Based in Tampere, he ran a long-established textile shop and played a central role in the religious, cultural, and educational life of the local Tatar community.

The chairman of the Tampere Tatar Congregation, Vahit Wafin, is his grandson. Jewelry designer Ildar Wafin (b. 1995) is the son of Vahit. The Wafin's operate a carpet shop Mattocenter in Helsinki.

== Life ==
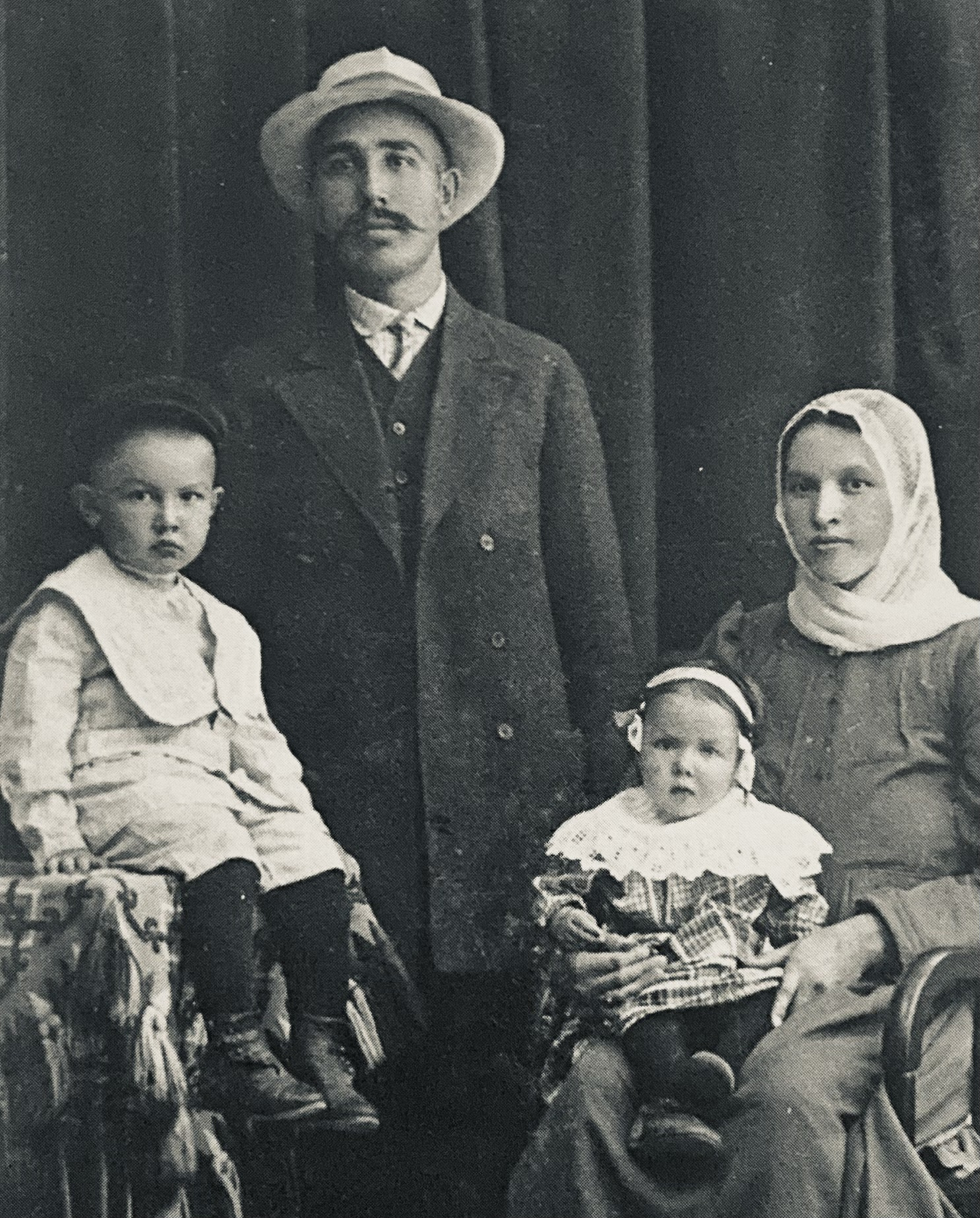
Zinnetullah and Mushfika Wafin with their children, Semiulla and Fatima (1911)

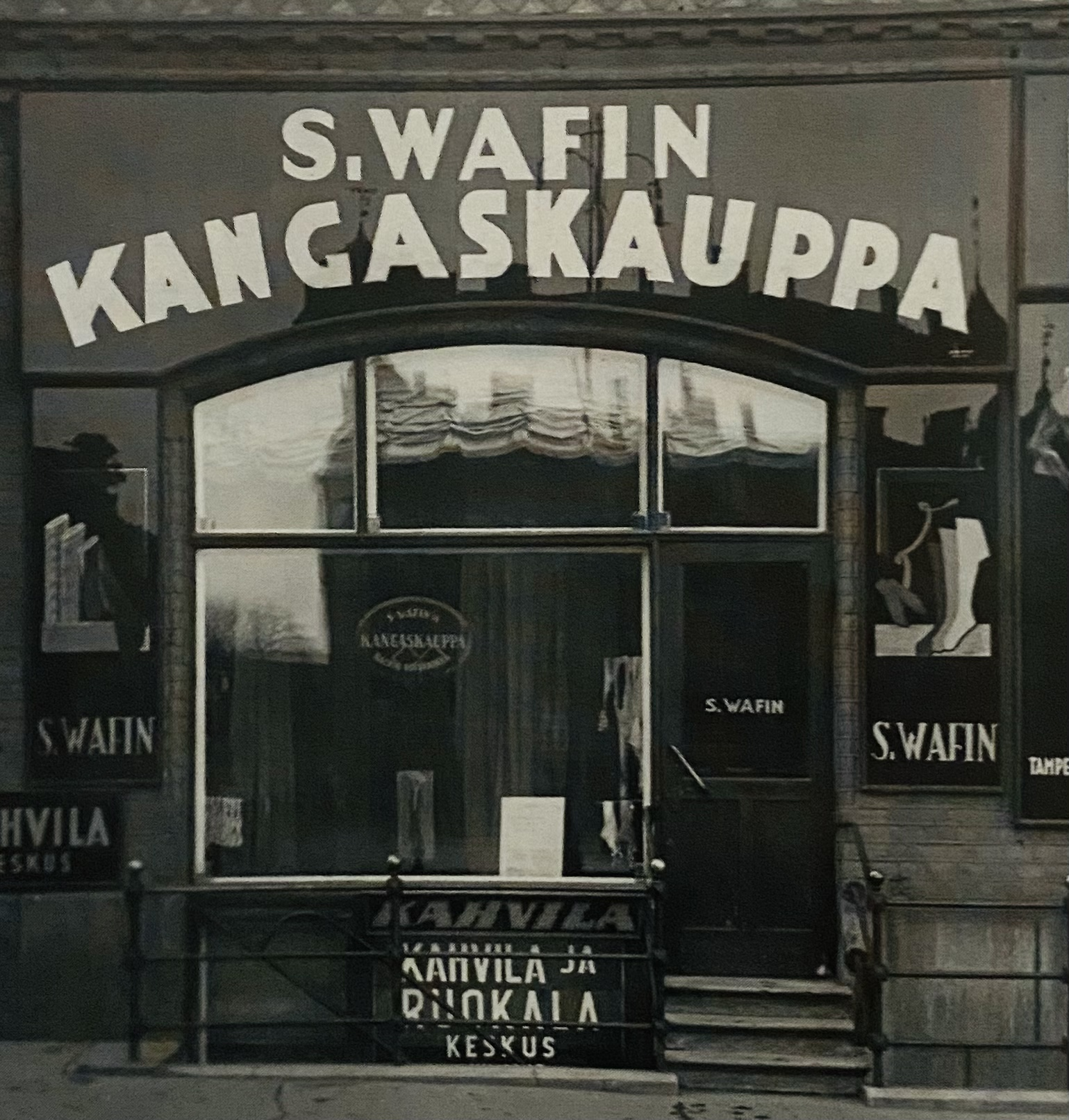
The Wafin fabric shop in Aleksis Kiven katu, Tampere

Semiulla Wafin was born as the son of Zinnetulla and Mushfika (Möshfika) in the Tatar village of Aktuk, located in the Sergachsky District of Nizhny Novgorod Governorate, Russian Empire (now Krasnooktyabrsky District, Nizhny Novgorod Oblast, Russia). As a child, Wafin emigrated to Terijoki with his parents. They eventually settled in Tampere. Wafin went to work at his father Zinnetulla’s fabric shop S. Wafin ("Siniatulla Wafin") in 1925. Semiulla took over the shop after his father passed and operated it from 1941 to 1982. It was located in Aleksis Kiven katu.

Wafin was a founding member and a member of the board of The Tampere Islamic Congregation. He was the chairman from 1951 until his death in 1983. Wafin was also involved in the founding of The Tampere Turkish Society, and for many years operated at the board.

Among the local Tatar community, Semiulla Wafin was known as a determined cultural worker, who with his actions tried his best to develop and conserve the Tatar culture in Finland. He published books, such as in 1962, with imam Habiburrahman Shakir a booklet named "Din derésleré ve Islam tarihçese", and with local artist Aisa Hakimcan a reprint of a 1908 book released originally in Kazan named "Islām dīne ḥaqq dīnder".

Wafin was married to Mahrusa Allayarı (1911–1984), a Tatar from Xinjiang. They met in Berlin, where Semiulla studied economics. Among the Finnish Tatar community she, like her husband, took an active role in the cultural life of the community and for example served at the board of the Tampere Turkish Society and wrote for Ayaz Ishaki's magazine Yaña Milli Yul as "M. Wafa". In Berlin, Mahrusa graduated as a dentist and before this she had studied in Istanbul. Father of Mahrusa was a wealthy landowner Zakircan Allayarı (né Aldargarov), who with his brother Siddik founded libraries.

Semiulla Wafin was passionate about the Turkish language and taught it to the children of his community. He was in extensive correspondence with Turkic people abroad and wrote to them about the lives of Tatars in Tampere.

During the Continuation War, Wafin served as a corporal and was awarded afterwards. He took part in Operation Stella Polaris. He and his wife are buried at Vatiala Cemetery, located in Kangasala. The Wafin's had children Batu, Urhan and Fuat. His father Zinnetulla had arrived to Finland the first time in 1900 to visit his uncle Mustafa Ismail. He established his successful shop in 1910. In his memorial letter, Aisa Hakimcan described Mushfika, the mother of Semiulla, as "the mother of the people".

== Versions of name ==
Semiulla Wafin / Vafa; Literary Tatar: Сәмигулла Вафин; Səmiğulla Wafin (Wafa / Вафа without the Russian suffix); in Tatar İske imlâ script سميع الله وفا.
