= Aisa Hakimcan =

Tatar artist who worked in Finland (1896–1972)

- Айся Хакимджан; Гайсә Хәкимҗан عيسى حكيم جان
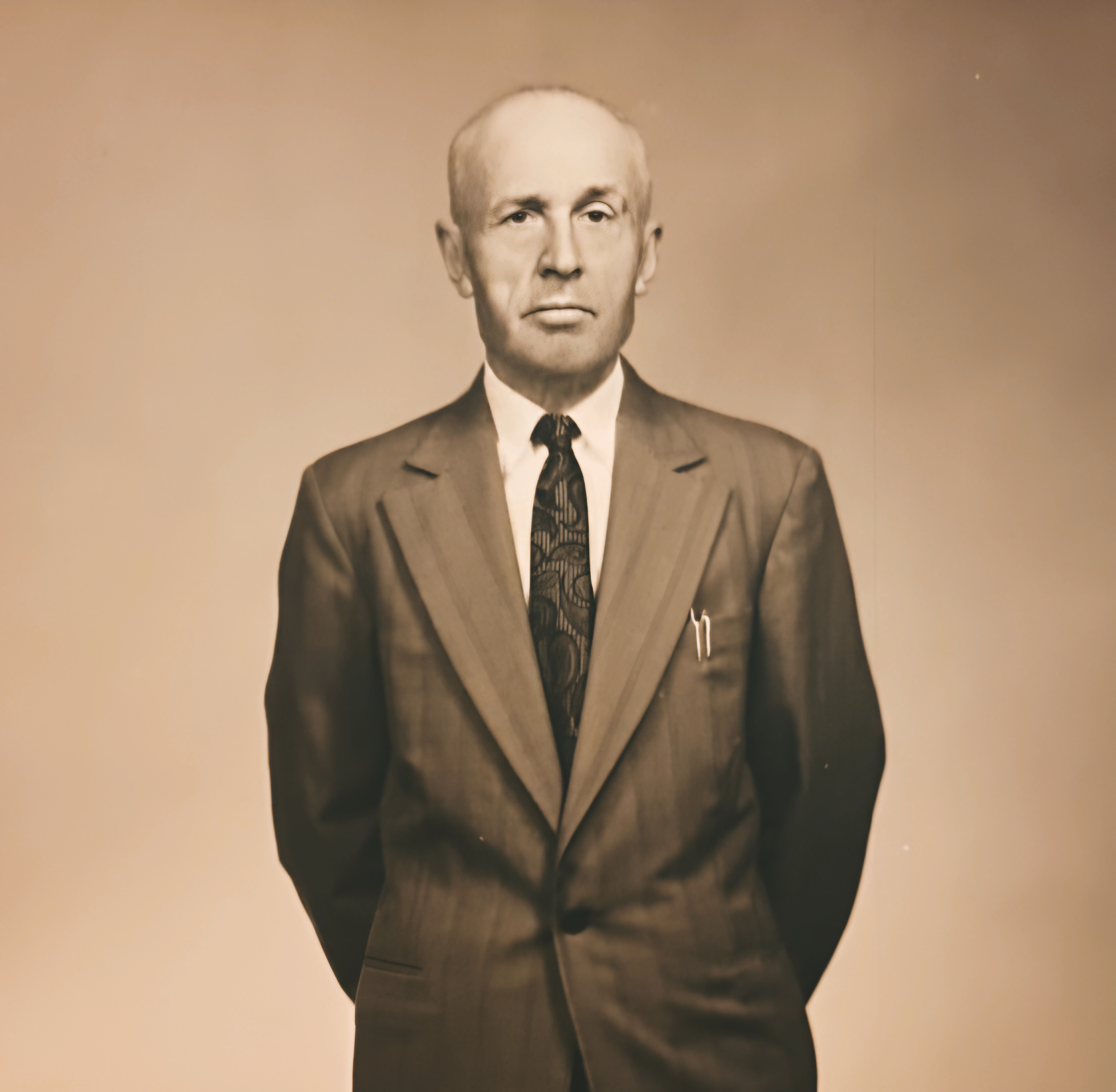
- Hakimcan in 1960
- Born: Айся Хакимжанов عيسى حكيم جان; 13 March 1896; Aktuk, Sergachsky District, Nizhny Novgorod Governorate, Russian Empire
- Died: 5 November 1972 (aged 76); Tampere, Finland
- Resting place: Kalevankangas Cemetery
- Other names: Aisja Hakimsanoff, Hakimdshan / Hakimsan
- Organizations: The Tampere Tatar Congregation; The Tampere Turkish Society
- Notable work: ميللى شيعر وه جرلار Milli şiğer wə cırlar ('National poems and songs', 1956–1966)
- Spouse: Servi سروى
- Children: Aliye, Reşid
- Parents: Khakimzhan Mukhametaminov حكيم جان محمد أمین; Maryam Alyautdinova مريم علاء الدين
- Relatives: Ümer Sali (uncle)

Aisa Hakimcan (Note: Tatar İske imlâ: عيسى حكيم جان (ʿĪsā Ḥakīm Jān) Russian: Айся Хакимджан (Aisya Khakimdzhan); born Khakimzhanov (Хакимжанов).) (Tatar: Гайсә Хәкимҗан, romanized: Ğaysə Xəkimcan, Tatar pronunciation: [ʁɑj'sæ χækimˈʑɑn] (Note: In the Mishar Tatar dialect, letter ğ (г) is not pronounced, c (җ) is an affricate [d͡ʒ] and /χæ/ is /хa/.); 13 March 1896 – 5 November 1972) was a Tatar artist and publisher among the Tatar community of Tampere, Finland. He was known as a nationalistic cultural figure, who directed plays, wrote poetry and led Tarawih gatherings. In 1970, he took part in a conference for the 50th anniversary of Tatarstan in Kazan. His son, Räshid Hakimsan (Reşid Hakimcan; 1934–1997), was a hockey player and referee.

== Biography ==
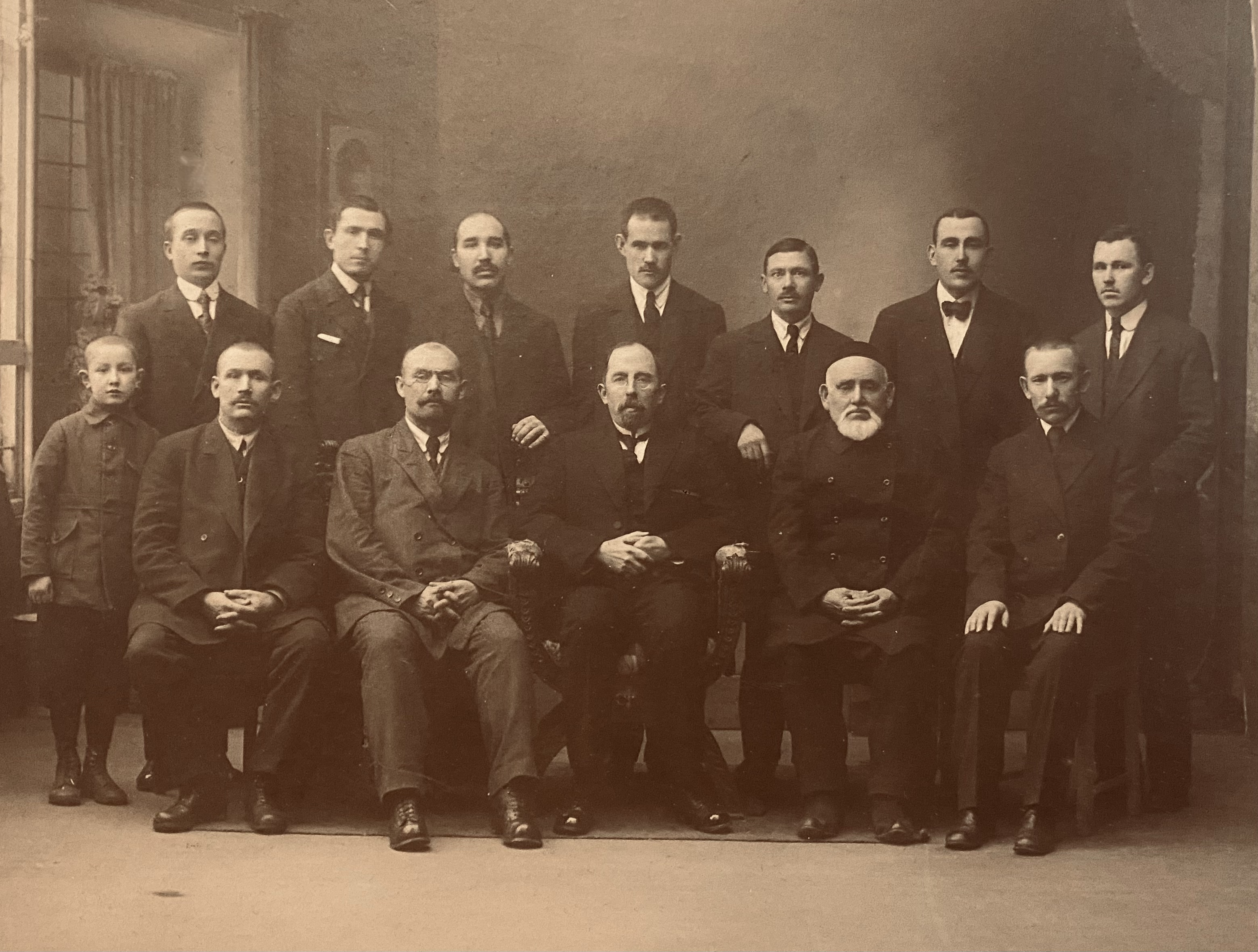
Aisa Hakimcan (back row, second from left) and fellow Tampere Tatars with Idel-Ural politician Sadri Maksudi (sitting middle), year 1920

Born as the son of Khakimzhan Mukhametaminov and Maryam Alyautdinova in the Nizhny Novgorod Governorate Mishar village Aktuk, Aisa Hakimcan (Aisya Khakimzhanov) came to Finland in 1917. Like most other Tatars of his generation, Hakimcan made a living as a merchant, but among the Tatar community of Tampere, he was best known as a tough leader and a versatile artist.

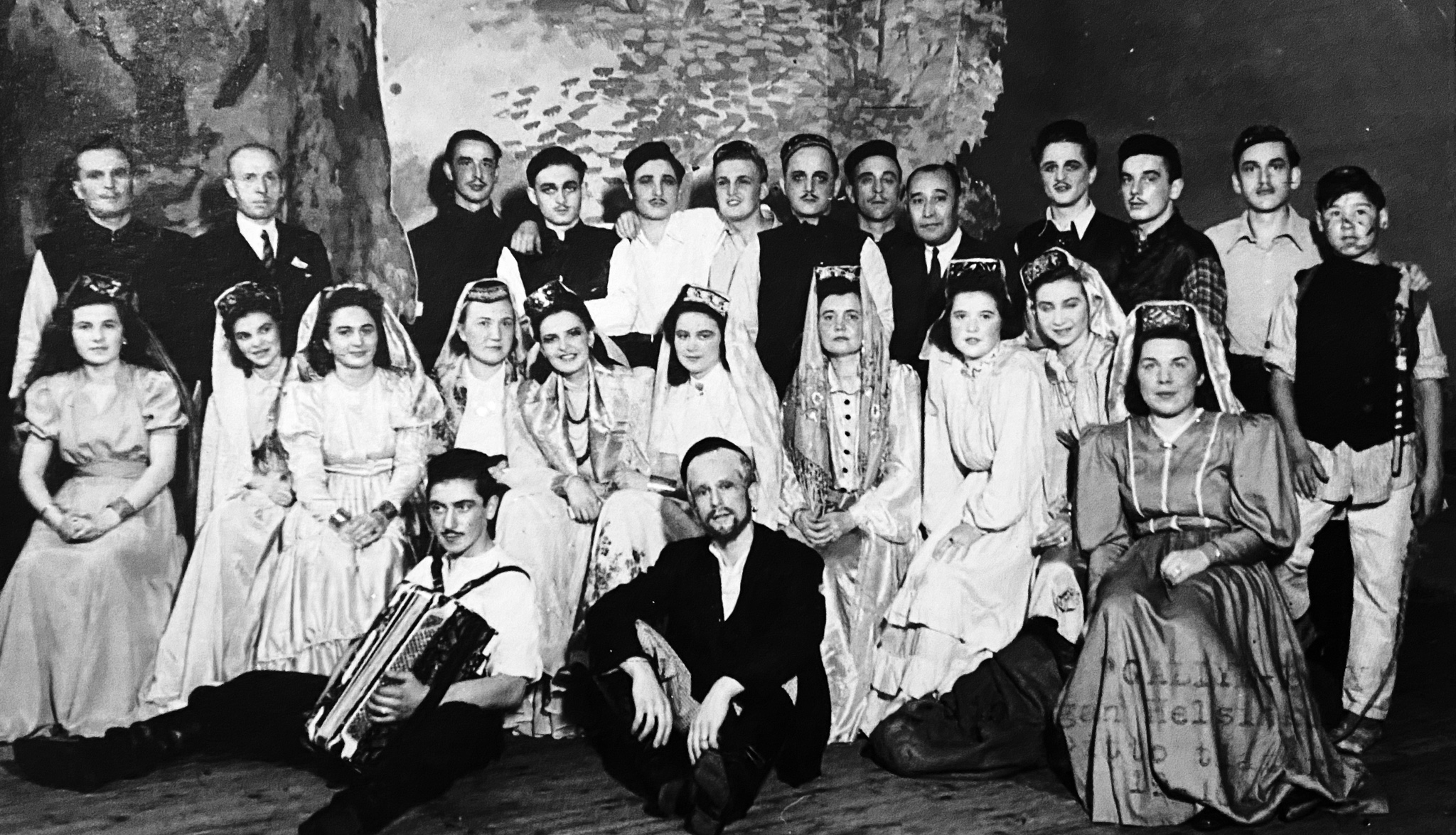
"Aliye banu" (Ğaliyəbanu), directed by Xəkimcan (back, second from left), performed by Tampere Tatars in Helsinki, year 1946. Daughter Aliyə in title role.

Hakimcan was involved in the founding of local Islamic congregation, and later worked at the board. Slightly before this, a short lived predecessor to given congregation was founded and Hakimcan was in a leading position of the project. Hakimcan was also the chairman of The Tampere Turkish Society in late 1940s, and vice chairman multiple times. At the turn of the 1920s, Hakimcan had been one of the Muslims in Tampere, who signed a letter to the imam of Helsinki, urging him to initiate the project of establishing a Tatar congregation.

Voice sample of Aisa Hakimcan (1952)

Among the community Hakimcan was known as a very musical person. He sang, played violin, mandolin and operated as a choir director. Hakimcan also wrote poetry and directed plays named Aliyebanu (Ğaliyəbanu) and Asılyar, both by Mirkhaydar Fayzi. He also acted himself; for example in 1930s, when a play Zöleyha (Zöləyxa) was shown at Tampere Theatre, in honor of guest Ayaz İshaki, who is said to have been very pleased with the performance and "appropriately chosen" actors. (Hakimcan was one of the leads and Turkestan-born Gibadulla Murtasin was the director.) Aliye, the daughter of Aisa, as well as the children of his brother; Zinnetulla, Semiulla, Hamdurrahman and Hafize, all took part in his plays. They were known as a talented family among the Tatars.

Hakimcan led the Tarawih gatherings of his community during Ramadan for decades, reciting the hymns "Elveda" (Əlwidağ) and "İlahi".

His poetry was nationalistic and dealt usually with the feelings of longing for his birthplace. In short, he expressed his feelings in the opening page of his three-part publication, Milli şiğer wə cırlar ( ميللى شيعر وه جرلار; ’National poems and songs’, 1956-1966), as follows:

Belməsəm il dərtləren, min bolay yazmas idem. Millətemne söyməsəm, qulıma qələm almas idem - Translation: "If i did not know the sufferings of my people, i would not express my feelings in writing. I would not take a pen in my hand, if i did not love my people.

The publication consisted of works of the community, collected by Hakimcan. In 1935, Hakimcan wrote that he wished to return to his homeland with "children full of faith", ending the text with İnnə əd-dinə ğinda allahi əl-islam ("Indeed, the religion in the sight of Allah is Islam"; 3:19.). He referred to his people as "Turkish-Tatars" (Törek-tatar xalqı).

Hakimcan printed and published songs and poems with his close friend, imam Habiburrahman Shakir. In 1960s they published a booklet in honor of poet Ğabdulla Tuqay. With businessman Semiulla Wafin, he published a religious work called İslam dine xaq dinder (ايسلام دينى خاق ديندر).

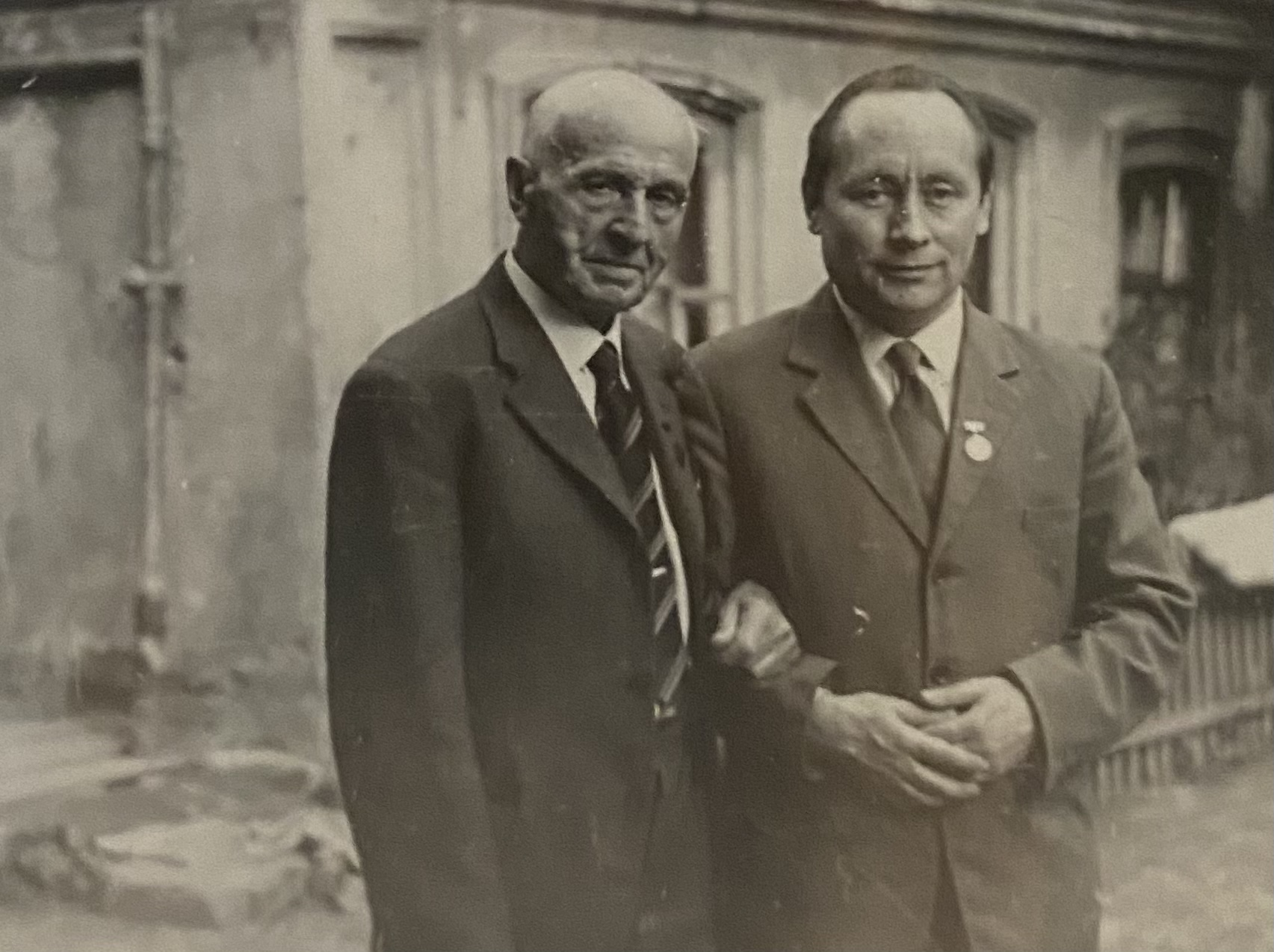
Ğəysə Xəkimcan, Röstəm Yaxin (Kazan 1970)

In 1938, a 20-year memorial service for Idel Ural State was held in Warsaw, organized by Tatar activist Ayaz Ishaki. Hakimcan was one of the seven Finnish Tatars who took part in the celebration. Led by the Polish Tatar imam Ali Woronovicz, they visited the tomb of the unknown soldier to honor the deceased fellow Muslims. In June 1970, Hakimcan was invited to Kazan, Tatarstan (TASSR), by Finnish Tatar cultural worker Ymär Daher, as part of the conference on the 50th anniversary of Tatarstan. There they went to the "G. Ibragimov Institute of Language, Literature and Art of the Tatarstan Academy of Sciences", where they were greeted officially. Folklorist Ilbaris Nadirov, who had lectured previously at Tampere, was also present. During the trip, Hakimcan paid a visit to poet Tuqay's grave to show his respects. Magazine "Sotsialistik Tatarstan" (Социалистик Татарстан) published a poem by Hakimcan and briefly interviewed him.

In his 1993 publication Çit illərdəge tatar ədəbiyətı həm matbugatı, Kazan Tatar literary scientist Xatıyp Miñnegulov, who has studied Tatar writers abroad, mentioned a few Finnish Tatars; Xəsən Xəmidulla, Sadri Xəmit, Gəwhər Tuğanay, and also Ğaysə Xəkimcan.

== Poem ==
Üz awılım Yañapar

Qışın mayaq utırtalar

olı yul buylarına.

Yañaparnıñ qızlarına

səlam uğıllarına.

Yəş çağımda küp yöredem

qayın çağıllarında.

Şul cirlərne sağınıp cırlıym

iskə töşkən çağımda.

Yörer idem qırlarında

qaytsam Yañaparıma.

Ber tuyğançı cırlar idem

utırıp yarlarına.

Xətfə kebek yəşel ülən

üsə İsmət tawında.

Taw yulları, qır yulları

bar da bit uylarımda.

Minem söyep eçkən suwım

Mar küpere yanında.

Sarı sazım, Torataşım,

əle də bit küz aldımda.

Yörer idem, menər idem

zur tawnıñ başına.

Tağın ber qat cırlar idem

Basıp qoyaş qarşında.

In his poem "My home village Yañapar" (Aktuk), Hakimcan longs for his birthplace and wishes to return.

This poem was included in a Finnish Tatar paper of Sadri Hamid's, called Ak yul, in 1968.

== Versions of name ==
- Aisja Hakimsanoff (from Russian Айся Хакимжанов, Aisya Khakimzhanov); Hakimdshan / Hakimsan
- Aisa Hakimcan (Standard Tatar: Гайсә Хәкимҗан; Ğaysä Xäkimcan / Ğaysə Xəkimcan; Yaña imlâ: غايسه ھەكيمجان (In Mishar Dialect ğ / غ / г is not pronounced)
- عيسى حكيم جان (İske imlâ)

In modern Russian sources, the surname is spelled Хакимджан (Khakimdzhan), which is a closer equivalent of the Mishar affricate pronunciation [d͡ʒ]. Latin letter c stands for same sound in given dialect.

Given name comes from the Arabic ʿĪsā, which means ”Jesus”. Surname is derived from Arabic Ḥakīm (’wise’) and Persian jân (’soul’).

Surname suffix -ov stands for a patronymic.

== Personal life ==
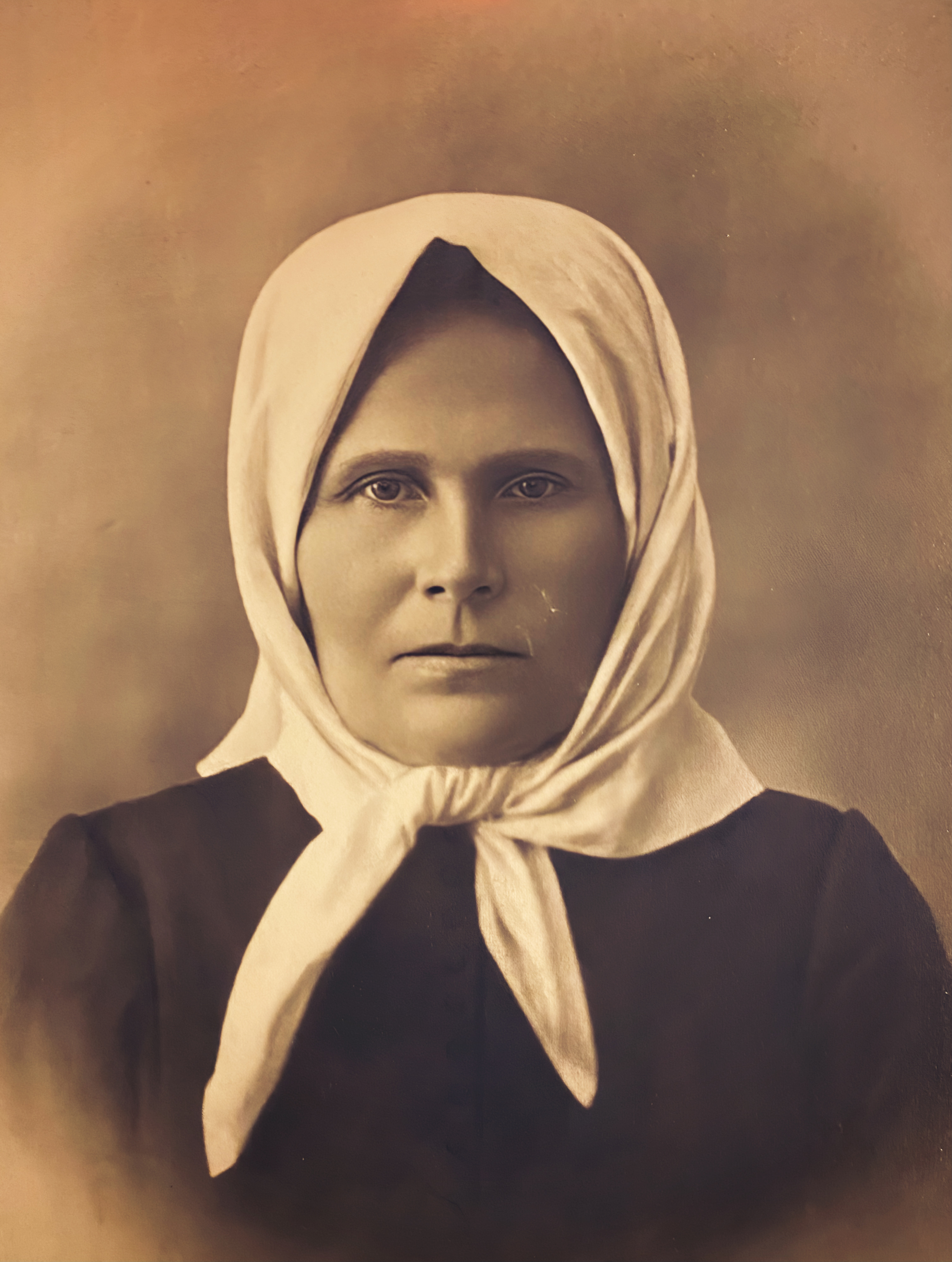
Meryam Alautdin (Марьям Аляутдинова, 1863–1947)

Aisa was married to a Finnish woman from Nokia, named Sylvia "Särvi" (سروى, Sərwi; 1904–1965). She converted to Islam and was actively involved among the Tatar community with her husband. They had two children; daughter Aliye, who was a talented singer and actress in Tatar language, and a son, hockey player-referee Räshid.

The older brother of Aisa, Ibrahim Hakimdshan, as well as his mother, widow of a farmer, Merjam Alautdinoff (Maryam Alyautdinova; 1863–1947) also lived in Tampere. Businessman Ymär Sali was the uncle of Aisa. Other brother Hasan Hakimsanoff lived in Finland only briefly in early 1900s.
