= Gibadulla Murtasin =

Finnish Tatar teacher, leader, artist, journalist and writer

Gibadulla Murtasin Гибадулла Муртазин عبيدالله مرتضى
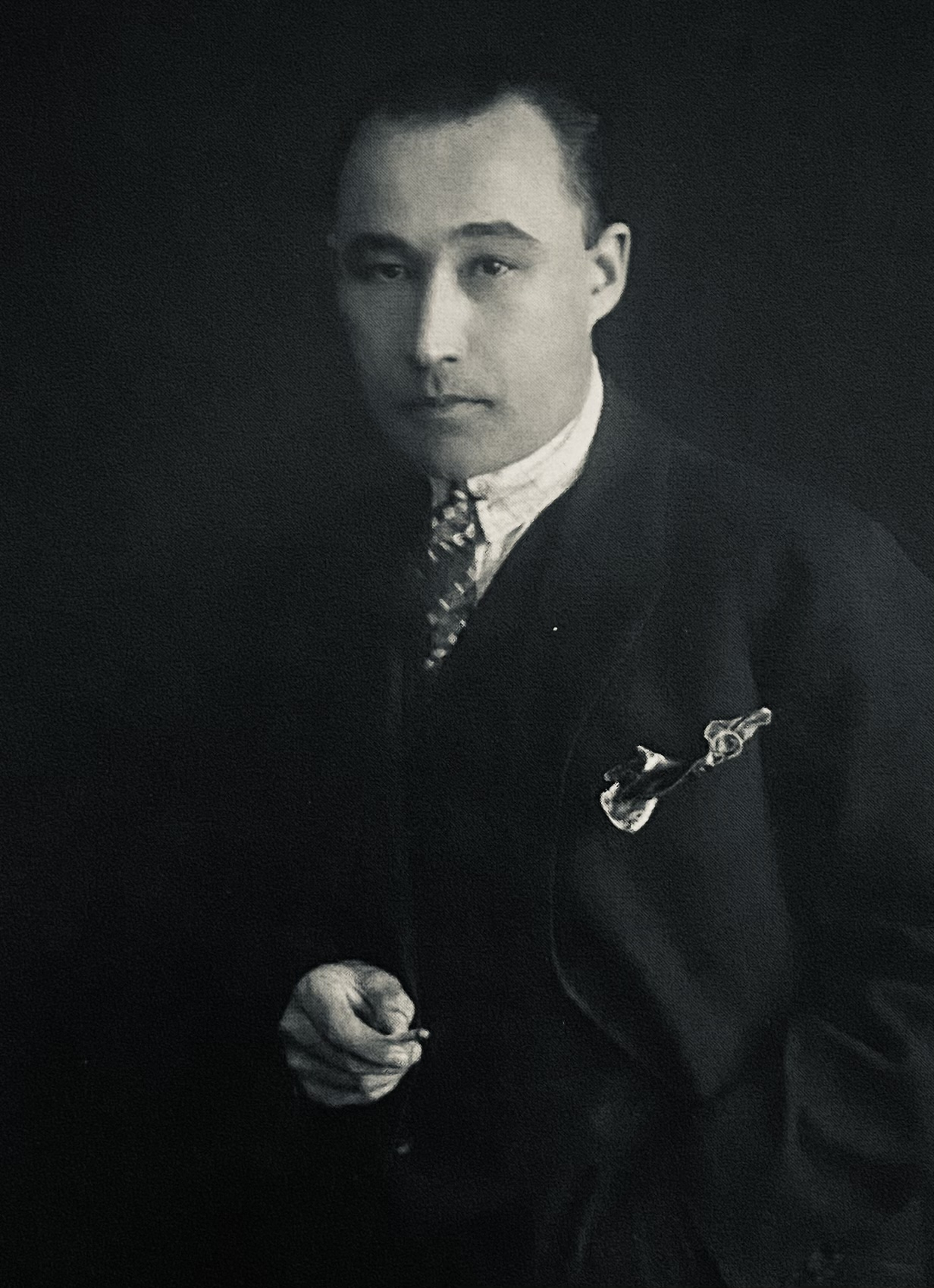
- Born: October 25, 1895; Turkestan, Central Asia
- Died: July 28, 1968 (aged 72); Helsinki, Finland
- Spouse: Halime Abdrahim

Gibadulla Murtasin (Гибадулла Муртазин, Tatar: Гобәйдулла Мортаза / عبيدالله مرتضى, Ğobəydulla Mortaza; October 25, 1895 – July 28, 1968) was a teacher among the Tatar community of Tampere and Helsinki, Finland. He also contributed to their cultural life by organizing theater plays among other things. Murtasin was born in Turkestan.

== Biography ==
=== Life before Finland ===
Murtasin (Murtazin, Mortaza) was born in Turkestan region to a wealthy family. He left his birthplace to study in a madrasa in Sarapul, Russia. Due to its innovative teaching methods, Sarapul was considered one of the best madrasas in Russia. However, the conservative groups thought that the teaching methods were too radical and the Russians had a fear that the qualitatively high level of education could increase the position of the Muslims too much. They also accused the teachers of anti-Russian activities. The state ended up closing the madrasa in 1912. Murtasin continued his studies at the Teachers College in Kazan and graduated in four years.

Murtasin was summoned to the Russian army during World War I. He was then transferred to Ufa, to train other draftees. During the war, Murtasin was ordered to the Baltic front. At one point, when he was in the middle of a difficult battle, he and his unit were blockaded. He was taken as a prisoner and sent to Denmark.

Alimcan Idris, a spiritual guide for the Muslim prisoners at a war camp close to Berlin, transferred Murtasin and other prisoners to his location. Idris assisted them by arranging work for them during their time of imprisonment. Murtasin worked in a composing room of a printing house where The Quran was being printed in Arabic.

=== Life in Finland ===
Gibadulla Murtasin arrived in Tampere, Finland in 1923. This was a particularly productive period. He stayed in the city for nearly 20 years and these years were characterised as the most active and fertile period for the patrimonial culture and identity in Tampere.

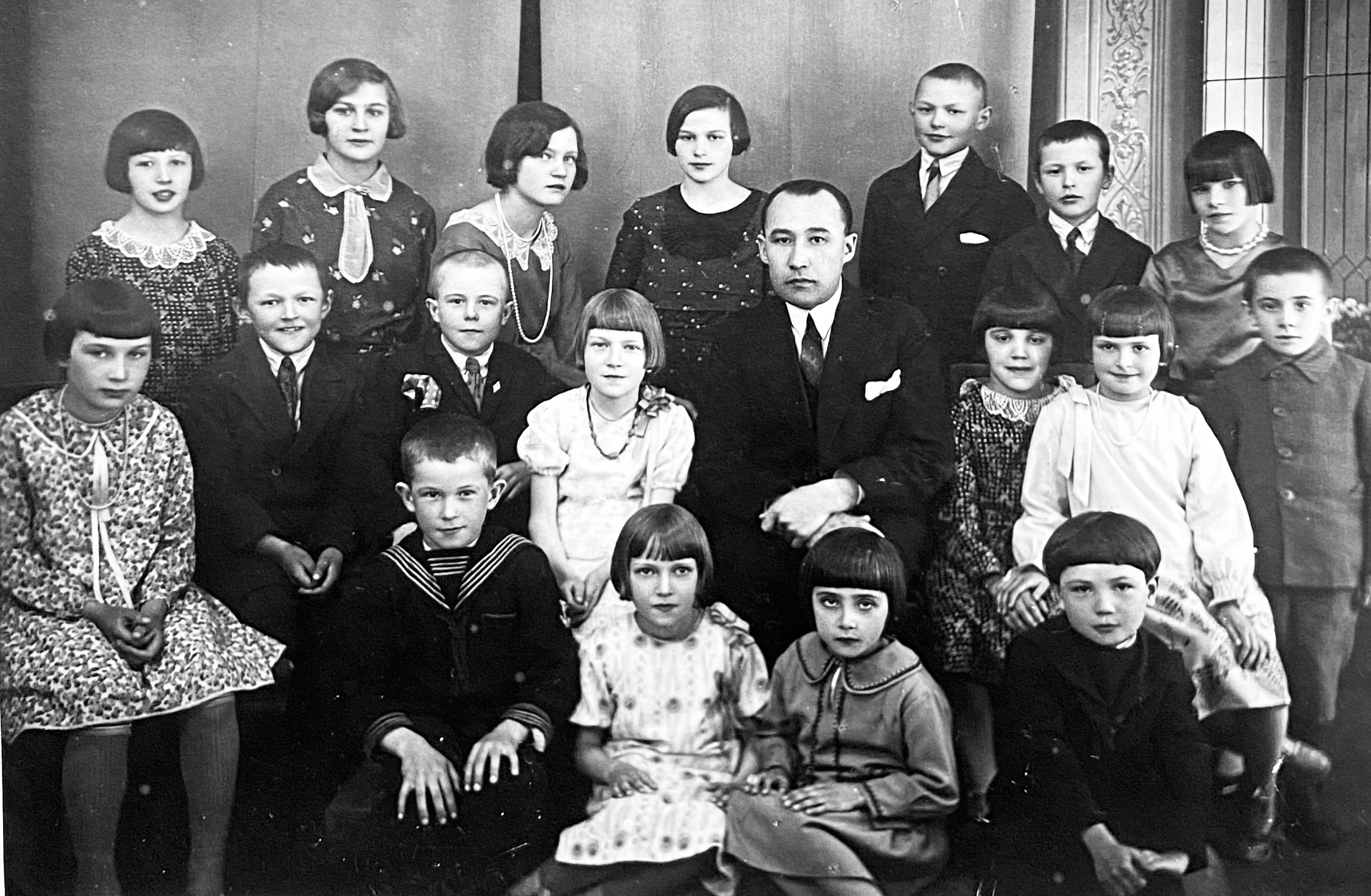
Mortazin with his class of Tatar pupils in Tampere, early 1930s.

During the years 1923–1941, Murtasin operated as an imam in Tampere. Alimcan Idris, who had helped him before, suggested the official position for him. Murtasin however declined, stating that his vocation was that of a teacher, not imam.

Murtasin wrote under a pseudonym of Haberçı in the paper Yaña Milli Yul, edited by Ayaz Ishaki, on the cultural events of the Turkic people in Tampere. In 1931, he wrote about how their community's younger generation was not getting enough education on their own culture and religion. He said that they had to trust their abilities and establish their congregation so that they did not disappear into the culture of the majority. In 1935, The Tampere Turkish Society was registered. Later on, The Tampere Islamic Congregation was established, but before this, the congregation founded in 1935 was very important for the community. It organized the Muslims in Tampere into all kinds of cultural and religious events. Muslims (mainly Tatars) from other parts of Finland often joined these events. Murtasin was a crucial part of making all of this happen. He operated as the chairman of the congregation for multiple years.

In 1938, Murtasin traveled to Warsaw, where Ayaz Ishaki had organized a 20-year memorial celebration for Idel-Ural. A few other Turkic people from Finland traveled there with Murtasin, such as artist Aisa Hakimcan, and businessman Ymär Sali. At the celebration, Murtasin read a few chapters of the Quran for the blessing of Mufti's Alimcan Barudi and Riazaeddin Bin Fahreddin. Ishaki orated a speech where he highlighted the importance of the celebration. The trip became very important to everyone involved.

In Finland, Murtasin was known as a talented teacher. His military training had taught him to demand discipline and order in his teaching job. His students sang songs, recited poems, and performed theatre plays at different kinds of parties. Murtasin operated as the director of these plays and related activities, for example, the making of invitation cards and leaflets.

Murtasin was also a talented violin player, writer and a speaker. When he spoke, he did so in a short and sharp manner. Murtasin wrote a book called Tel sabaqlarï I which was published in Helsinki in 1950. He was also one of the editors of the magazine Maḥallä ḫabärläre.

In the 1930s, Murtasin worked as a teacher in a Turkic mother tongue school in Tampere. In 1941, he moved to Helsinki to teach Islam to children there. In 1947, he married Halime Abdrahim.

Murtasin is buried in the Islamic cemetery in Helsinki.

== Literature ==
- Muazzez Baibulat: The Tampere Islamic Congregation: the roots and history (in English, Tatar, and Finnish). Gummerus Kirjapaino, 2004. ISBN 952-91-6753-9.
