= Tampere Turkish Society =

Tatars' association in Tampere, Finland

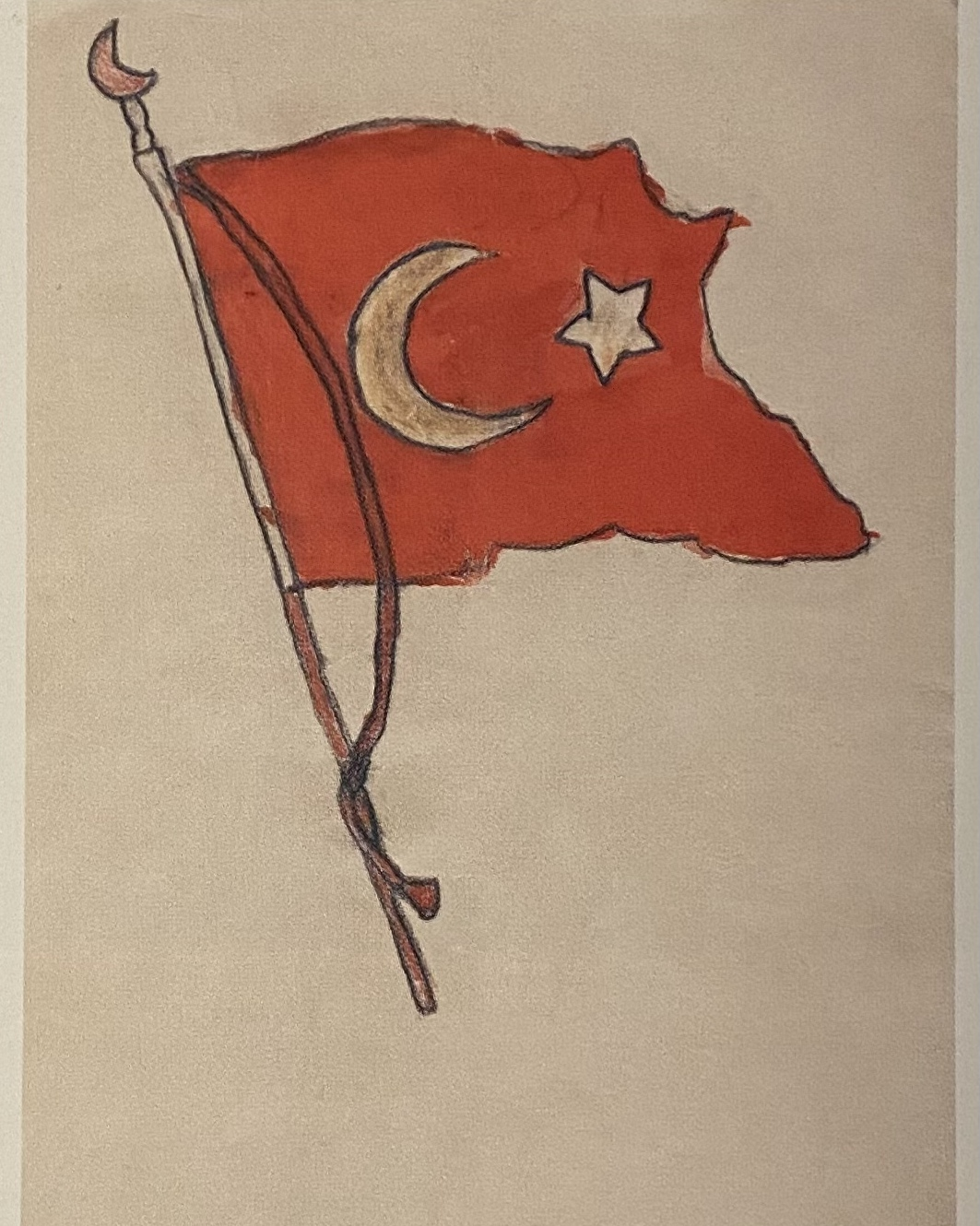
Handbill of a theater play ”Behıtsız yıgıt”, by G. Kamal, drawn by local Tatar child in the 1930s.

The Tampere Turkish Society (Tampere Türkler Birliği, Finnish: Tampereen Turkkilainen Yhdistys) was an association of Tatars in Tampere, Finland, which focused mainly on arranging religious occasions and cultural gatherings, such as theater events. (Tatars in the country were usually known by the general term "Turks" during the 1900s).

== Background ==
A contributor in Finnish Tatar circles, teacher/artist Gibadulla Murtasin, who came to Tampere in 1923, wrote during those times for writer/publisher Ayaz Ishaki's magazine called Yaña Milli Yul about the life of Tatars in Tampere. In 1931, he wrote about how the younger generation of their community was not getting enough education on their culture and religion. Murtasin stated, that they have to establish their own association/congregation, so that they do not lose their identity in their new home of theirs.

In the year 1935's issue of the same magazine, Murtasin wrote that at the end of the previous year, the women of their community had formed an association called "Yeş Hanımlar Oyışmasi" (Young Ladies' Association). In January 1935, it organized a celebration during Ramadan, where an active member of their community, Mehrusa Wafin held a speech. In her speech, she emphasized how establishing their own society would create interest in their peoples history and culture and thus hope for the future. During that night, in the hall where the celebration was held, the flag of Idel-Ural was seen on the stage. When the audience saw it, they stood up and yelled "Yeşesın!" (Hurrah!).

== Establishing the society ==
The Tampere Turkish Society was registered in July 1935.

Afterwards, the members of the society have described it as being a very important aspect in conserving and developing their linguistic, religious and cultural life; a job that has been carried on since by The Tampere Islamic Congregation.

The society arranged for the Tatars in Tampere different kinds of religious and cultural events. Many Tatars from other parts of the country took part as well. Gibadulla Murtasin, the man who had previously written about the subject, was a very important contributor in forming the society and in arranging its events.

The society had many chairmen, for example: the above-mentioned Murtasin, Semiulla Wafin, Ymär Sali and Aisa Hakimcan.

== Name ==
Many Finnish Tatar establishments at the time used the name "Turkish" (Finnish: turkkilainen) instead of "Tatar". This Turkic community tried to avoid using given term due to it being viewed as a Russian epithet with a negative connotation. Turkey, and the symbol of its flag operated as a kind of reference point to their identity.

Other similarly named establishments have been the Helsinki-based Finlandiya Türkleri Birliği (Suomen turkkilaisten seura), and Turku Türkler Birliği.

== Literature ==
- Muazzez Baibulat: The Tampere Islamic Congregation: the Roots and History (in finnish, tatar and english) Gummerus Kirjapaino Oy, 2004. ISBN 952-91-6753-9.
- Kadriye Bedretdin (reporter): Tugan Tel: Kirjoituksia Suomen Tataareista. Suomen Itämainen Seura, 2011. ISBN 978-951-9380-78-0.
