= Ymär Sali =

Finnish entrepreneur (1876–1951)

- Умяр Сали; Гомәр Сәли عمر سالى
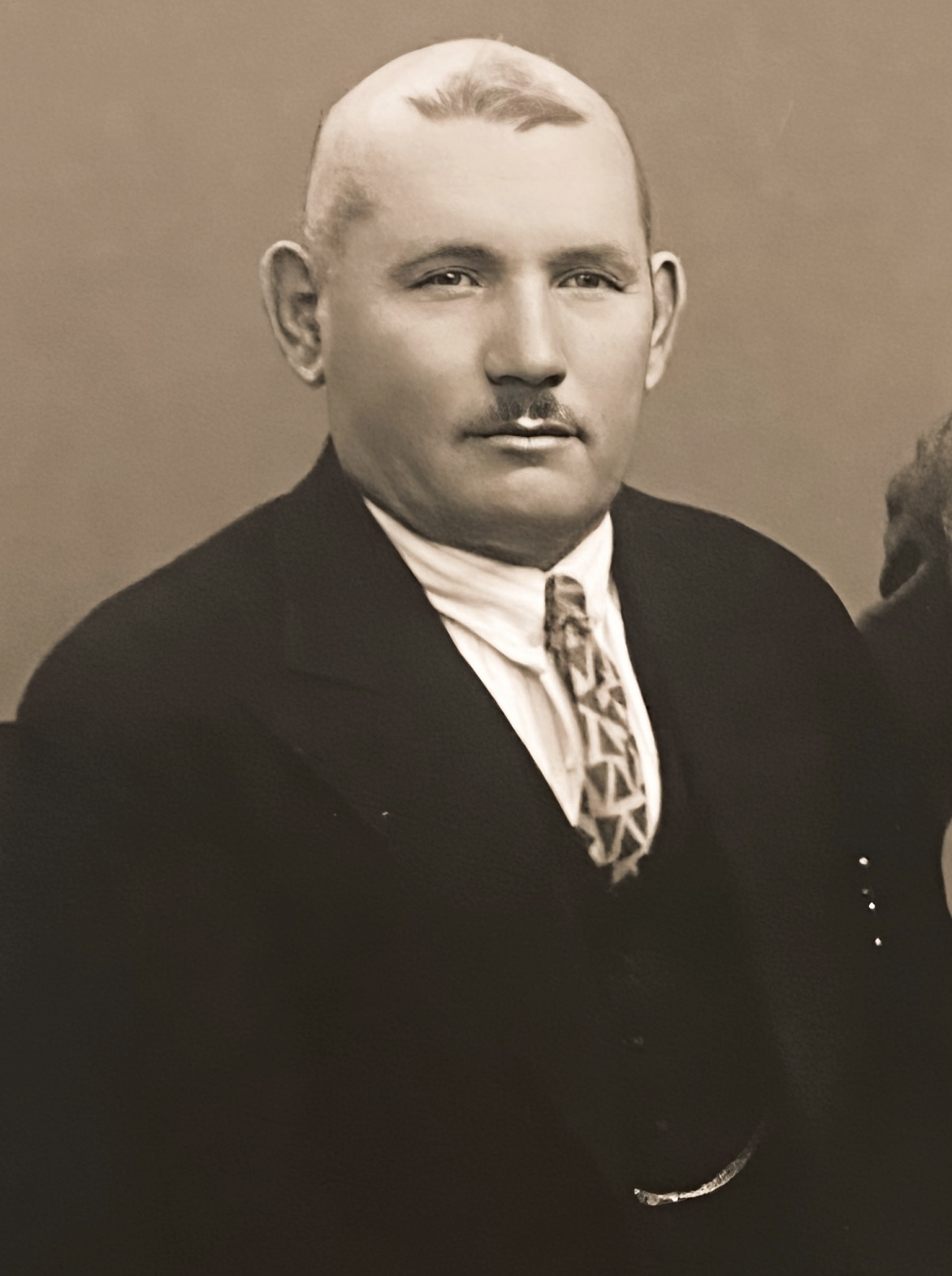
- Sali in 1932
- Born: Умяр Аляутдинов عمر علاوالدين; 5 February 1876; Aktuk, Nizhny Novgorod Governorate, Russian Empire (now Nizhny Novgorod Oblast, Russia)
- Died: 12 August 1951 (aged 75); Tampere, Finland
- Resting place: Kalevankangas Cemetery
- Other names: Ymär Alautdin Sali; Alautdinoff; Salejeff
- Spouse: Zeliha Gubeydullah
- Children: Abdul-Kayum
- Parent(s): Alaeddin, Sevcan

Ymär Sali (né Alautdinoff; (Note: Russian: Умяр Аляутдинов (Umyar Alyautdinov) Mishar Dialect: "Ümär" Literary Tatar: Гомәр Сәли / Галәветдин (Ğömär Säli / Ğäläwetdin)) 5 February 1876 – 12 August 1951) was a Finnish entrepreneur of Tatar descent. As a successful shopkeeper in Tampere, Sali was the main financial contributor in establishing the congregation for local Tatars and today he is revered as a kind of father figure of the congregation. Sali is also remembered as someone who helped fellow Mishar Tatars moving to Finland and the ones who settled in Saint Petersburg.

== Biography ==
Ymär Sali (né Alautdinoff) was born as the son of Alaeddin Sali (Saleev) in the Tatar village of Aktuk, in the Russian Empire's Nizhny Novgorod Governorate. In 1896 he married Zeliha Gubeidullin (Gubaidullina / Gubeydullah) in the village. Sali had visited Tampere in 1800s as a merchant many times before eventually moving in the city in 1926.

Sali had a shop in Hämeenkatu, which sold a wide variety of products, such as furs and fabrics. The shop was a place where many local Tatars gathered to talk about their daily lives. He worked in the shop until his death.

Sali has been described as a sensitive person, who deeply loved his people. Due to his financial contribution, the Tampere Islamic Congregation was established in 1943. He operated as chairman of the board for the rest of his life. Before, he had also been a member of the board for the Finnish-Islamic Congregation. When the congregation in Tampere acquired its first property with 960 000 Finnish marks, Sali's portion of it was 596 000. He also donated a house for the congregation, located in Tammelankatu. When the congregation later bought another property, Sali once again donated most of the money. He was also a chairman of the board for the Tampere Turkish Society during 1930's.

Sali took part in a 20-year anniversary celebration of the Idel-Ural State in Warsaw, Poland during February 1938. It was organized by Tatar activist and writer Ayaz İshaki. He gave Sali the honor of laying down a wreath to a tomb of a Polish Muslim soldier.

During the years 1950–1951, Sali published a magazine called "Islam Mecellesi". It was edited by imam Habiburrahman Shakir.

Sali came from a very modest countryside and even though he made a lot of money as a businessman, he maintained his humility. His lifestyle was simple and he spent a big portion of his wealth in causes that would help conserve and develop the identity of his people.

Sali has been named as a key figure in helping Mishar merchants moving from Saint Petersburg to Finland as well as ones who stayed in the city. In 1930, with the help of his stepsister Meryam (mother of artist Aisa Hakimcan), fellow villagers Yarulla Sadretdin, Andercan Zainetdin and Dinmuhammed Ainetdin, Sali tried to bring theologian Musa Bigiev into Finland. The plan was too risky however so it was canceled.

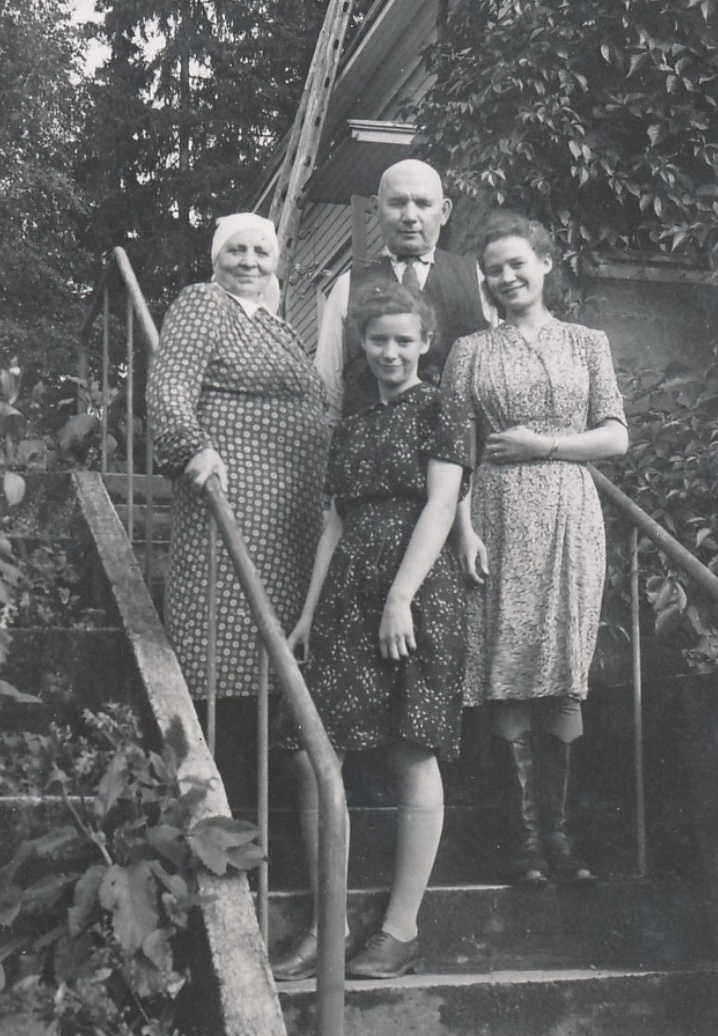
Sali with his wife and their foster children Radife and Leyle.

Sali and his wife together took care of their three foster children (Radife, Leyle, Rabia), who had come from Narva as war refugees. The biological child of the Sali's, Abdul-Kayum died young in Leningrad and his son, their grandchild Hasan, disappeared during World War II. In addition to their foster children, they took care of the stepsister of Ymär, Meryam (1863–1947), his mother Seucan (Sevcan), and other relatives.

Zeliha was a big supporter of her husband. She has been described as "the mother figure of the congregation". As a talented and tireless hostess, she organized many celebrations. The members of the congregation have said that without Ymär and Zeliha, they would've never been able to establish it or maintain its financial success.

== Karan's poem ==
When Sali died in 1951, the Tatar-born Turkish scientist-writer Lebib Karan (father of actress Lale Oraloğlu) sent his condolences from Istanbul to Tampere in the form of a poem. (Transcribed by a Finnish Tatar Muazzez Baibulat in 2004).

Finlandiye tatar baylarınnan Ymär Sali, bötın andagı tatarlar anı olıga sanıy, bu könnerde aziz canı tıgı yortka kavıştı, şöbhe itmibız, Teñrınıñ rahmetıne kavıştı. Merhüm çiksız söye idı milletın, dinın, hem de tugan ölkesın. Haletınde tapkan malın tormadı ul kızganıp, Finlandiyenıñ Tampere şeherınde bır tatar mehallesın kordı, meçıtın de, mektebın de gıl üzı hazır ittı, alarnı yeşetır öçın vakıf hazırlep kittı. Ymär Salinıñ ülüı yara açtı yöreklerde, bik küp tatar kaygıradır yakında hem yıraklarda, kaygırabız anıñ öçın kürgen, işıtkennerıbız. Teñrı añar ciñıl itsın tufragını, gürını, hem de añar hazır itsın ocmahınıñ türını. Ymär Sali ürnek bulsın anda kalgan baylarga, yerdem itsınner bar milli ışlernı uñaylarga, alar temamlasa idı urtak kalgan ışlernı, bırlık bırle yeşetsınner bar milli ışlernı.

— Lebib Karan
