= Ildar Wafin =

Finnish jewelry designer (born 1995)

- Born: 1995 (age 30–31); Järvenpää, Finland
- Education: Royal College of Art (MA)
- Relatives: Semiulla Wafin (great-grandfather)
- Website: ildarwafin.com

Ildar Wafin (born 1995) is a Finnish jewelry designer. Wafin has his own eponymous brand, and his creations have been worn by, among others, actor-musician Jared Leto and Jenni Haukio, the spouse of President Sauli Niinistö. Wafin graduated from the Royal College of Art in London in 2022. Wafin is of Tatar descent.

== Career ==
Wafin creates his jewelry by hand. In jewelry design, he values the personal human touch more than machine-driven perfection. In addition to his Tatar roots, his sources of inspiration include Finnish nature and architecture.

Wafin studied at the Institute of Design at Lahti University of Applied Sciences from 2015 to 2019 and spent time as an exchange student in Milan. In 2022, he graduated from the Royal College of Art of London with Master’s degree in Jewellery & Metal, and completed an internship at Louis Vuitton. Since then, Wafin has focused on his own eponymous brand, working from his studio in Helsinki.

Wafin competed in the finals of the Hyères International Festival of Fashion, Photography and Accessories in France in 2018. He entered the competition with a jewelry collection in the Tatar language titled Öleşlär. The collection included a bracelet, earrings, rings, and a brooch, crafted from 18-carat gold, silver, rose quartz, sapphires, and tourmalines. The gold used in the collection was inherited from his grandfather. Although he did not win, Wafin regarded the competition as an important experience.

Wafin’s creations were worn by Jenni Haukio at the Independence Day Reception (the Presidential Ball) in 2018. In 2024, Jared Leto wore a piece designed by Wafin, the Ekiyet jewel, during a concert.

In 2024, Wafin designed a collection for Kalevala Jewelry, which “draws inspiration from the pine trees growing in the archipelago—their resilience and rugged beauty.”

Wafin was awarded the Finnish Fashion Awards in the New Talent category on May 31, 2024. He received the prize for his “exceptional talent and craftsmanship, and for weaving his Tatar heritage into the stories of his striking jewelry.”

== Personal life ==
Wafin was born in 1995 in Järvenpää and is a fifth-generation Tatar in Finland. His parents, Vahit and Tinet Wafin (née Nisametdin), run an oriental carpet shop called Mattocenter on Fredrikinkatu in Helsinki, where he has also worked himself. Ildar Wafin has two brothers, Amir and Kadir.

Businessman and Tatar cultural figure Semiulla Wafin (1909–1983) was the great-grandfather of Ildar Wafin. London-based musician SHIRIN (Shirin Nisametdin) is the cousin of Ildar. They released a Tatar language single together in 2025 called "Olo Yulnen Tuzane".
