= Saadet Çağatay =

Turkish turkologist and professor

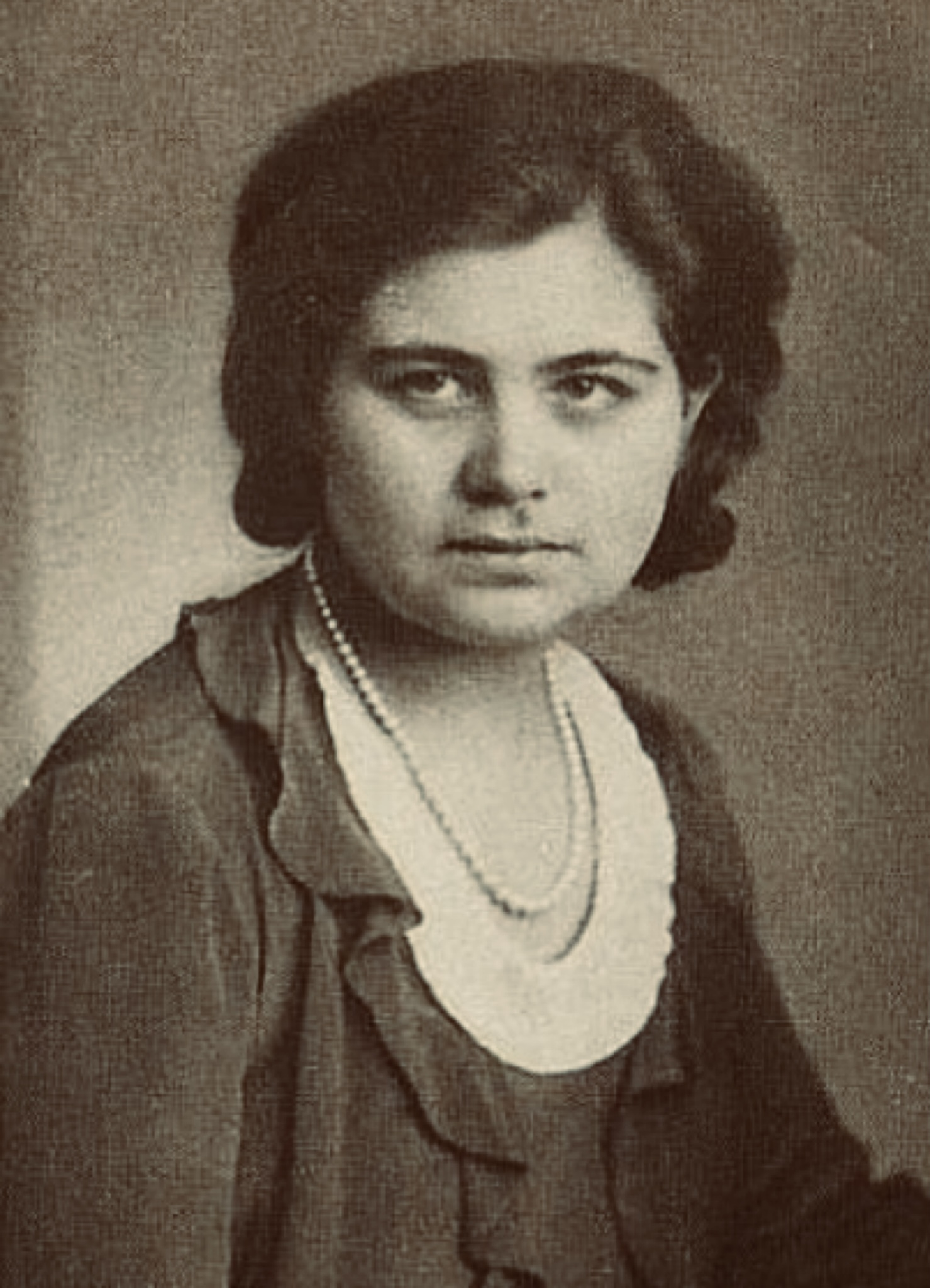
- Saadet Çağatay year 1931.
- Born: 27 July 1907; Yaushirme, Russian Empire
- Died: 24 June 1989 (aged 81); Ankara, Turkey
- Resting place: Cebeci Asri Cemetery
- Other names: Saadet İshaki Çağatay
- Occupation(s): Turkologist, professor, writer
- Spouse: Tahir Çağatay
- Parent(s): Ğayaz, Məryəm

Saadet Çağatay (née İshaki; Tatar: Сәгадәт Исхакый / Исхакова, lit. 'Səğadət İsxaqi / İsxaqova'; 27 July 1907 – 24 June 1989) was a Turkish turkologist, professor and writer of Tatar descent. She was a significant developer of Turkology in Turkey. Her father was the politician-writer Ayaz İshaki.

== Early life ==
Saadet İshaki (later Çağatay) was born in village of Yaushirme, Kazan. Her father Ayaz divorced her mother Meryem (Məryəm) in 1908, and she spent her childhood mostly with her grandfather Ğiləcetdin xəzrət.

When Çağatay graduated from the primary school of her village, she started studying in Mariisnkaya Gymnasium. After the October Revolution, her father had to flee to Berlin. During that time, Çağatay was being taken care of by her uncle and aunt. In 1922, Ayaz Ishaki invited her daughter to Berlin, but Çağatay was denied a passport at Kazan. A little later, Çağatay traveled to Saint Petersburg where she met smugglers. They were able to arrange her to Finland, though in there, Çağatay was put in a month long quarantine due to an ongoing pandemic in where she came from. Eventually her father came to the country and they traveled together to Berlin.

== Career ==
In Berlin, Saadet Çağatay began her studies at private German high school. At this point, her father had briefly moved to Istanbul. During these times in Berlin, there were such people as Sadri Maksudi Arsal and Yusuf Akçura and many Tatar-refugees. With the help of politician Hamdullah Suphi Tanrıöver, she became a citizen of Turkey in 1925, and the summer of next year she spent with her father in the country. While in Turkey, she had suggested to her father that maybe she should quit her studies in Berlin and move permanently to Turkey, but father-Ayaz did not accept this; he insisted that Çağatay should finish her studies in Berlin. Therefore, she came back to Germany. Little later her father came as well.

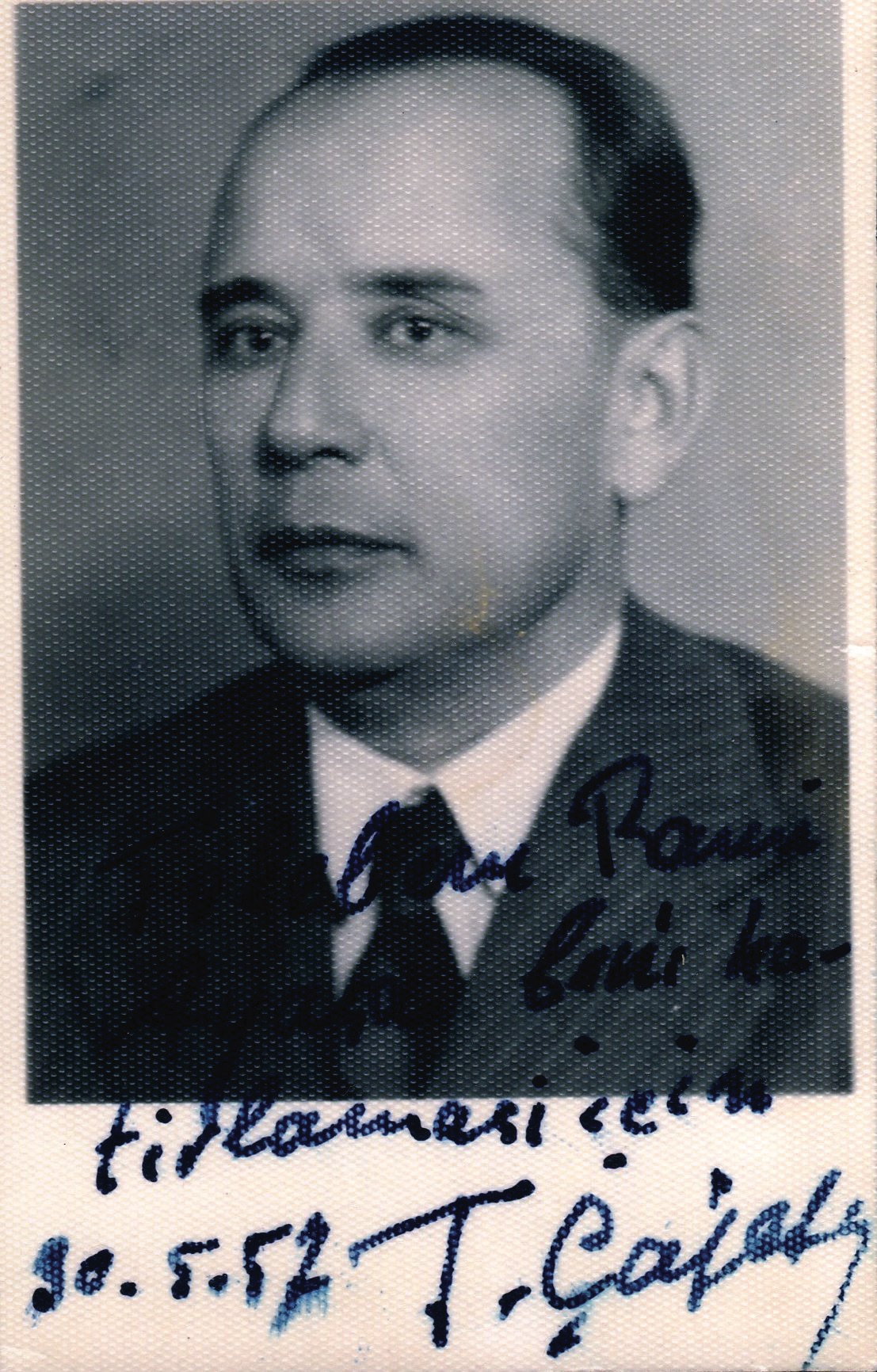
Tahir Şakir Çağatay, the spouse of Saadet Çağatay

Saadet Çağatay graduated from the Department of Turkology at University of Berlin in 1932. The same year, she married a professor named Tahir Çağatay.

Çağatay completed her doctoral degree under German linguist Willy Bang Kaup. The name of her thesis was Denominale Verbbildungen in den Türksprachen. She dedicated it to Crimean Tatar politician İsmail Gaspıralı. In it, she also promised that she would help her father with his magazine called Yaña Milli Yul.

In 1935, the Polish Academy of Sciences published work by Çağatay in Krakow, named Çora Batır.

Saadet Çağatay moved to Turkey with her husband Tahir in 1939. In there, she operated for example as an assistant in the Faculty of Language, History and Geography at University of Ankara, as an assistant professor in the Department of Turkology and eventually as a professor. During these times, she finished her work ltun Yaruktan İki Parça and also helped translate texts of German turkologists.

Çağatay, with her husband and father established a foundation in 1988, called Ayaz Tahir Türkistan İdil-Ural Vakfı. She donated her assets to the foundation.

Her work released in 1950 called Türk Lehçeleri Örnekleri'nin was taught at Turkish schools for many years.

Saadet Çağatay was diagnosed with liver cancer. She died in Ankara in 1989. She was buried in Cebeci Asri Cemetery, next to her husband Tahir Çağatay.

== Literary work by Çağatay ==
- Çora Batır (Krakow, 1935)
- Altun Yaruktan İki Parça (1945)
- Türk Lehçeleri Örnekleri'nin (2 editions, 1950, 1977)
- Denomanale Vebbildungen in der Türkprachen (Rome, 1953)
- Kazakça Metinler (1961)
- Türk Lehçeleri Örnekleri (2 editions, 1963, 1972)
- Reşid Rahmeti Arat (15.5.1900–29.11.1964), Belleten 29 (1965)
- Türk Lehçeleri Üzerine Denemeler (1978)
