= Ymär Daher =

Tatar cultural worker and researcher

Ymär Daher Умяр Дахер Гомәр Зариф улы Таһир
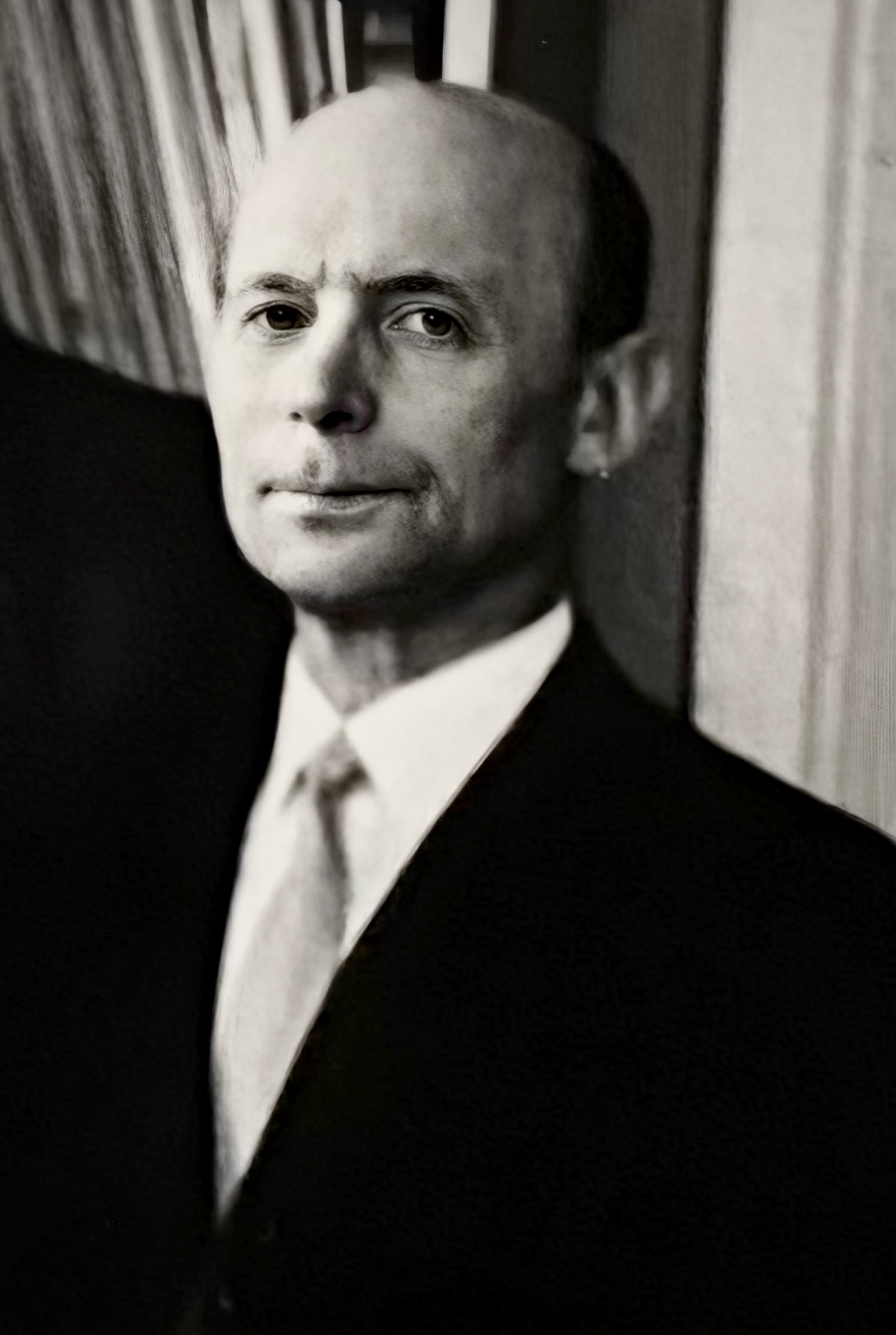
- Umar Taher in Kazan (1970).
- Born: Ymär Tahiroff; 5 November 1910; Kuysuı, Sergachsky Uyezd, Nizhny Novgorod Governorate, Russian Empire
- Died: 10 July 1999 (aged 88); Helsinki, Finland
- Spouse: Halide Samaletdin
- Children: 3; Okan, Rahile, Tinet
- Parent(s): Sarif Daher, Esma Sabir
- Honours: Title of meritorious cultural worker of The Republic of Tatarstan (1998)

Ymär Daher (né Tahiroff - Mishar Dialect: "Ümär", Literary Tatar: Гомәр Таһиров, Ğomər Tahir; 5 November 1910 – 10 July 1999) was a Tatar cultural worker, researcher, public servant, teacher and docent of turkology, doctor of philosophy and a vice judge. He moved to Finland in early 1900s.

As a researcher, Daher took part in many different altaistic and turkologic conferences around the world. He had versatile language skills and cultural knowledge and due to this worked for example with president Urho Kekkonen. Daher was an important figure in forming relations between Finnish Tatars and Russian Tatars during Soviet times. He was honored by the president of Tatarstan in 1998. Other accolades include one by Shah Mohammad Reza Pahlavi.

== Early life and career ==
Daher (Tahiroff) was born in 1910, in a Nizhny Novgorod Governorate village named Kuysu. (Russian: Овечий Овраг, Ovechiy Ovrag). He came to Finland with his siblings in 1922. His father, a merchant and political activist Sarif Daher (Zarif Tahir, 1884–1959) was living in the country already. Father-Daher was involved in establishing the association Etuvartiokansojen klubi in 1919. Its purpose was to help and create bonds between the minorities of Russia. The mother of Ymär Daher, Esma Sabir had died before he moved to Finland.

Daher began his studies in Helsinki, a private lyceum founded by professor Yrjö Jahnsson. From there, he graduated as bachelor of laws in 1930. Daher received a higher law degree from University of Helsinki in 1938, and the title of deputy judge in 1943. Between the years 1961–1970, Daher also became the bachelor of humanities and a master, licentiate and doctor of philosophy.

In 1930s, Daher began working at his father's business as a clerk and later as a sales manager. Next, he worked at the Helsinki tax office between 1938 and 1973. His titles during those years were inspector, department manager, business inspector, deputy secretary, department secretary and department head. In addition, he was the additional official of Uusimaa government in 1938, additional rapporteur of treasury in 1947 and additional official of the Supreme Administrative Court 1944–1953.

As a teacher, Daher taught Tatar and Turkish language and Turkology at the University of Helsinki in 1963–1991, and as docent in 1976–1980. He had many friends among the Finnish University community, such as Martti Räsänen, Armas Salonen, Aulis J. Joki and Pentti Aalto. Daher did his dissertation defense in University of Helsinki in 1970. The subject was "History of Anatolian Agriculture".

As a researcher, Daher took part in many altaistic and turkologic conferences in Turkey, Central Asia, United States and around Europe. He was involved in setting up the first International Altaistic Conference held in Finland in 1963. A book relating to the subject has been released under the name Tatarica.

In 1953 Shah Mohammad Reza Pahlavi awarded Daher with "Iran National Sports Federation Medal of Merit" for his help during Helsinki competitions.

== Cultural work ==
Daher was a very committed contributor among the Tatar community. He for example corked many years in the board of their congregation and cultural association. He was involved in the establishing of a school for the Tatar children. In late 1960s, Daher, with the help of poet Sadri Hamid and Finnish linguist Martti Räsänen established a cultural association, named after poet Ğabdulla Tuqay (Abdulla Tukay in Finland). Through the association, connections between Tatars in Finland and in Russia were made. First guests (whose trip Daher paid for himself) were scientists Rezeda Ğänieva, Xatip Ğоsmanov and Möxämmät Ğaynullin. They took part in many meetings in Finland and lectured about their life in Tatarstan and also met with Helsinki University professors. Also musicians, such as Röstäm Yaxin ja İlham Şakirov were invited through the association. In 1968, they performed in Tampere and Helsinki and also met president Kekkonen.

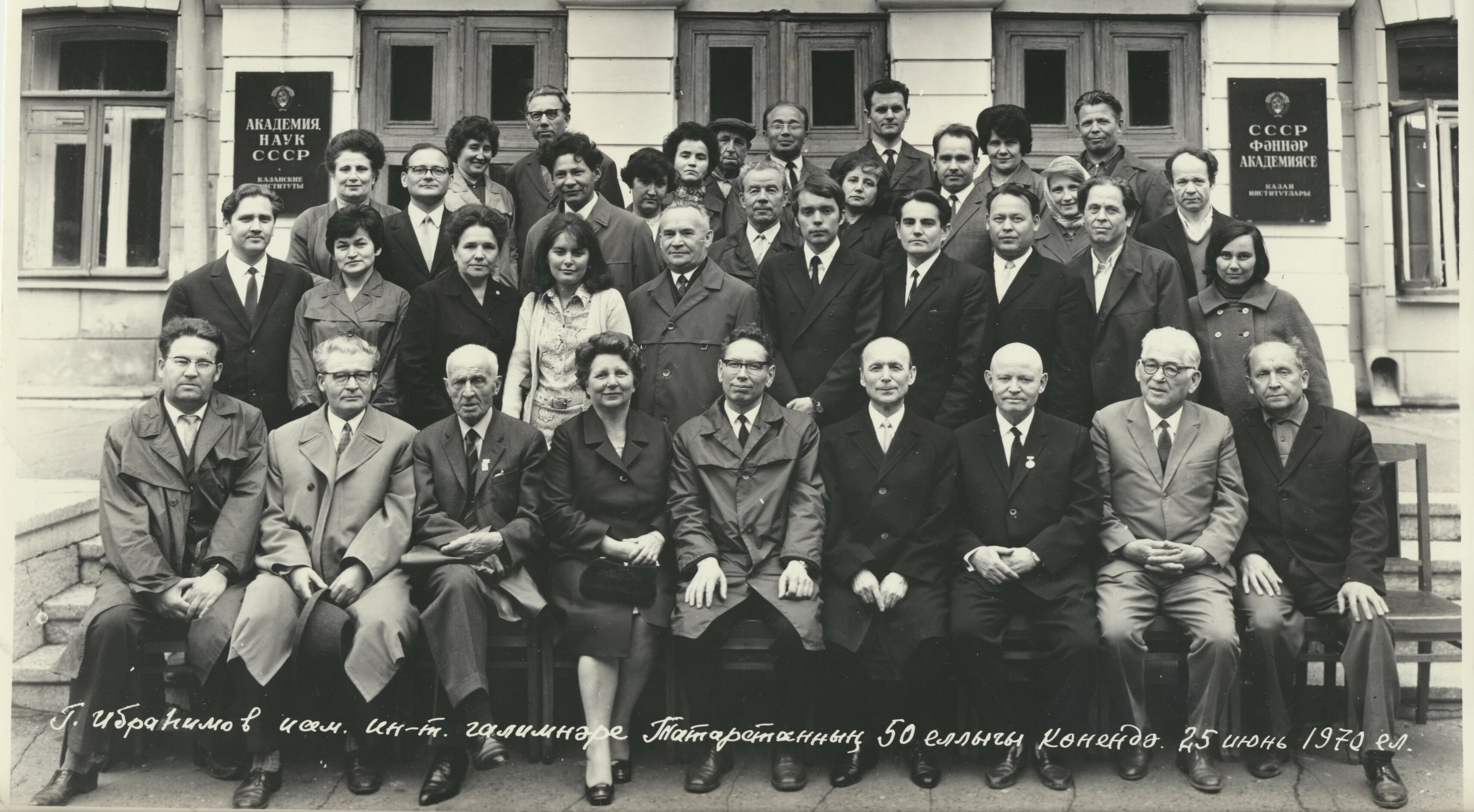
Kazan, 1970. Daher in front row, sixth from left. Also in picture, Finnish Tatar artist Aisa Hakimcan (third from left).

Daher himself visited Russia as well. For example, in 1970, when he was a guest in the G. Ibragimov Institute of Language, Literature and Art of Tatarstan Academy of Sciences. Finnish Tatar artist Aisa Hakimcan and folklorist Ilbaris Nadirov who had lectured in Tampere before were present as well.

The president of Tatarstan awarded Daher in 1998 with the Title of meritorious cultural worker of The Republic of Tatarstan.

Daher had diverse language skills and cultural knowledge. Daher helped president Urho Kekkonen many times, for example in 1971, when he visited Turkey.

== Military service ==
During the Winter War, Daher served at the headquarters of the intelligence and propaganda department. He was staff sergeant.

== Personal life ==
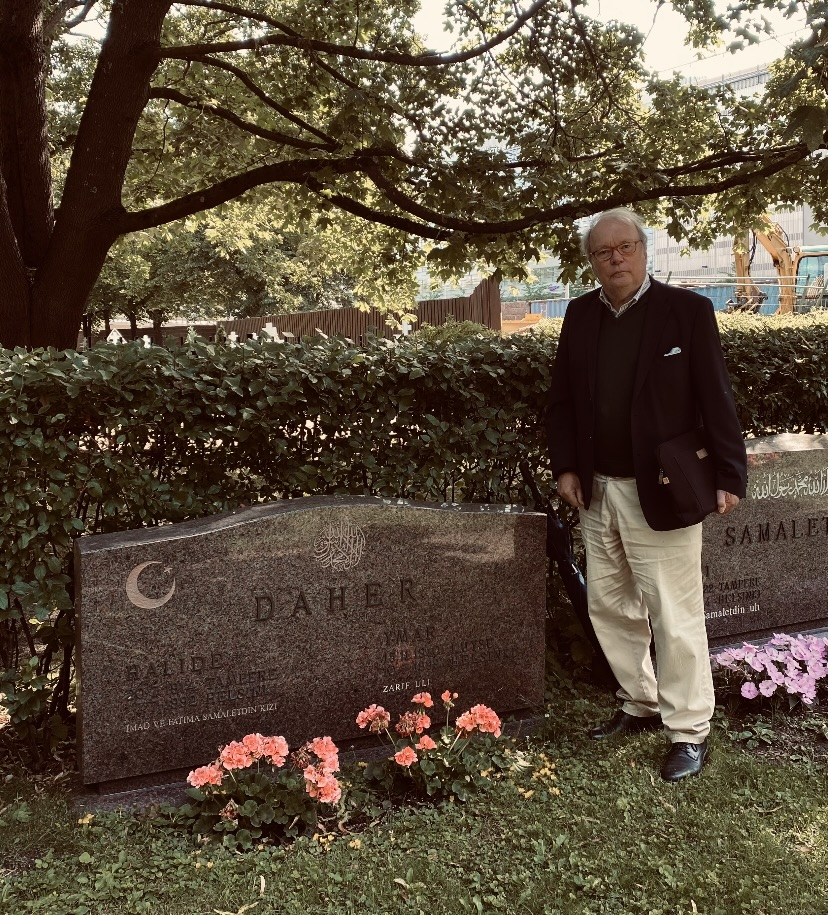
Okan Daher at his parents' grave - Helsinki Islamic Cemetery, 2022.

Daher died in Helsinki on 10 July 1999. His wife was Halide Samaletdin and children Okan, Rahile, Tinet. His son, Okan Daher (b. 1947), a long-time chairman of the Tatar congregation, has worked as a lecturer in Tatar Language and Culture at the University of Helsinki and has also for example published a Tatar-Finnish dictionary. Okan accompanied president Tarja Halonen on her trip to Tatarstan in 2010.

== Memberships ==
- Suomen-Islam seurakunta, hallitus 1936–1953, varapuheenjohtaja 1951–1953.
- Finlandiya Türkleri Birligi ry, hallitus 1935 - 1947, puheenjohtaja 1945.
- Turkkilainen kansakoulu, johtokunta, puheenjohtaja 1948 - 1958.
- Helsingin olympialaisten Iranin olympiajoukkueen olympia-attashea 1952.
- Ulkomaanyhdistysten yhteistoimikunta 1956 - 1978.
- Suomi - Pakistan-yhdistys ry, hallitus 1953 - 1977, puheenjohtaja 1978 - 1990.
- Suomen Unesco-toimikunnan Itä - Länsi-jaosto 1958 - 1963.
- Suomen itämainen seura, hallitus, rahainvartija 1963 - 1985.
- Abdulla Tukain Seura ry, hallituksen varapuheenjohtaja 1967 - 1975, puheenjohtaja 1976 - 1995.

== Accolades ==
- Suomen Valkoisen Ruusun Kunniamerkki 1964. (Medal of Honor of the White Rose of Finland)
- Iranin kansallisen urheiluliiton am 1953. (Iran National Sports Federation Medal of Merit)
- Tatarstanin tasavallan ansioituneen kulttuurityöntekijän arvonimi 1998. (Title of meritorious cultural worker of The Republic of Tatarstan)

== Name ==
In Literary Tatar: Гомәр Даһер, Ğomər Daher (Tahir, Таһир).

Original surname Tahiroff. (Tagirov, Тагиров).

While Tatars who came to Finland usually adopted their patronym as a surname, the ones who arrived with their parents or father took the patronym of their father's; in other words, the name of their grandfather. (Father of Ymär: Zarif Tahirov = son of Tahir). Due to this, mix ups have happened and some Russian sources write the patronym of Ymär as "Tagirovich / Tahir ulı”, instead of "Zarifovich / Zarif ulı.
