= Habiburrahman Shakir =

Tatar imam

- حبيب الرحمن شاكر
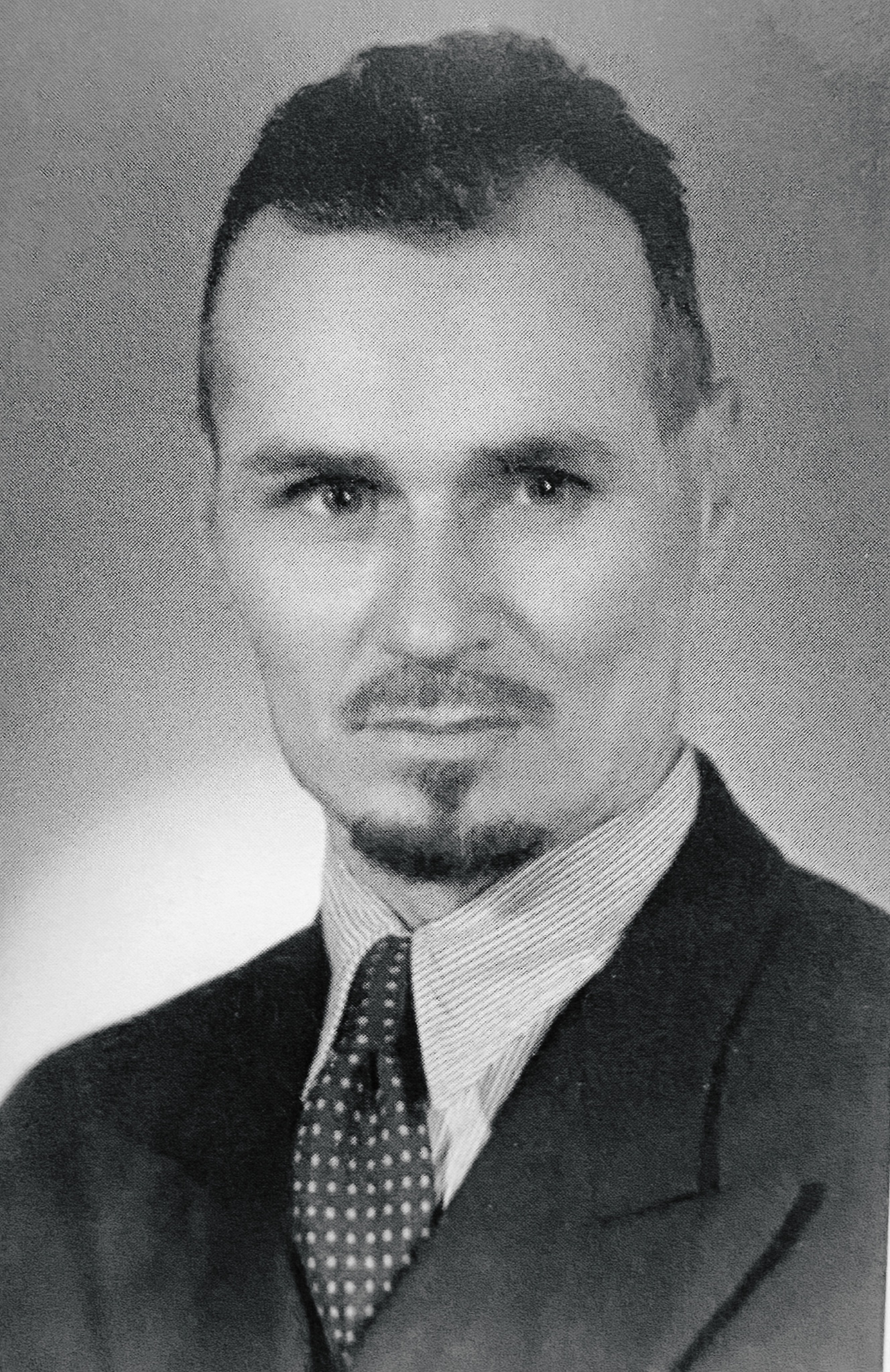
- Shakir in 1948
- Born: 10 December 1903; Danış awılı, Russian Empire (Now Kamsko-Ustyinsky District, Tatarstan, Russia)
- Died: 18 April 1975 (aged 71); Tampere, Finland
- Resting place: Helsinki
- Other names: Habibur-Rahman; Habiburrehman; H. R. Shakir al-Bulgari
- Spouse: Bibireyhana Veliulla
- Children: 8; including Tatar language teacher Hamide Çaydam
- Honours: Hajji

Habiburrahman Shakir al-Bulgari (Note: Tatar: Хәбибрахман Шакир, Xəbibraxman Şakir [χæ.bib.rɑχ'mɑn ʃɑ'kir]; әл-Болгари, əl-Bolğari) (10 December 1903 – 18 April 1975) was a Tatar imam, theologian and publisher.

Shakir was born in current day Tatarstan and became a part of the Finnish Tatar community when he arrived in Tampere during late 1940s. Shakir was known as a respected theologian in the Islamic world. Invited by the king of Saudi Arabia, Shakir made a pilgrimage to Mecca with his wife in 1972. Before his time in Finland, Shakir worked as a teacher in India, where one of his students was the later-president of Pakistan, Zulfikar Ali Bhutto.

Shakir was in correspondence with Kurdish theologian Said Nursi. He has been described as being among the "first European Nur students". Shakir was also in contact with Algerian nationalist Ahmed Tewfik El Madani.

== Biography ==
Habiburrahman Shakir (al-Bulgari) was born in village Danış awılı, now located in modern Tatarstan, Kamsko-Ustyinsky District. During his younger years, Shakir studied theology for ten years at Bukhara, among other places. During the Russian Revolution, Shakir escaped to Kabul, where he met his future wife, Bibireyhana Veliulla.

In 1947, as recommended by Musa Bigiev, Shakir moved to Tampere, Finland, where he became the local Tatar community's imam. Before this, he operated as imam in Peshawar and in 1942, Shakir moved to work in Bombay, where one of his students was the future president of Pakistan, Zulfikar Ali Bhutto. From there, he arrived to Finland.

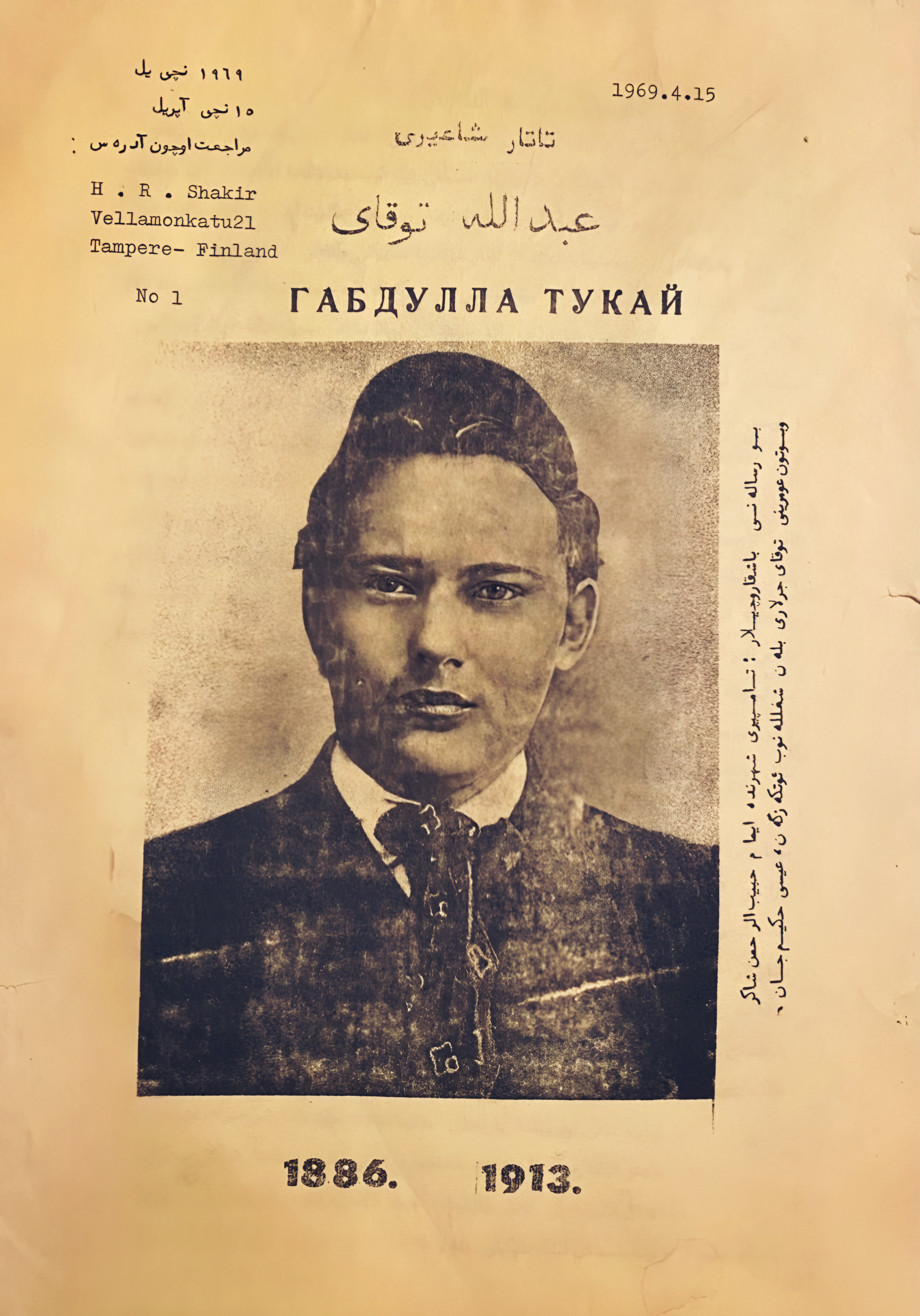
Ğabdulla Tuqay, by Şakir & Xəkimcan (Tampere 1969).

In Finland, Shakir also worked as a reporter and publisher. In 1949, Shakir started to publish a monthly magazine named Finlandiye Islam Mücellesi (later called Islam Mecellesı). It was read locally and also abroad. Some of his other publications are for example a work with Semiulla Wafin named Din derésleré ve Islam tarihçesé, and a booklet in honor of Gabdulla Tuqay with his close friend, artist Aisa Hakimcan. Shakir is known to have wrote poetry and some fiction as well. One of his plays was called "Niyaz beynin mirasi". Central themes of the play were fatalism and free will.

As an Islamic theologian, Shakir was well respected already before arriving in Finland. He was regularly visited by people who had questions about religion. The wide library of his was utilized as well, whenever needed. In addition to Tatar, Shakir also spoke Turkish, Arabic, Urdu and Persian.

In 1966, Shakir traveled to Tashkent and met his old friend, theologist Ziyauddinkhan ibn Ishan Babakhan.

Bibireyhana Shakir was also a devoted Muslim. She helped especially the women of the Tatar community with religious matters. Bibireyhana was the daughter of a known imam, Shamsulla Veliulla, who during his life published 30 or so religious works in Kazan.

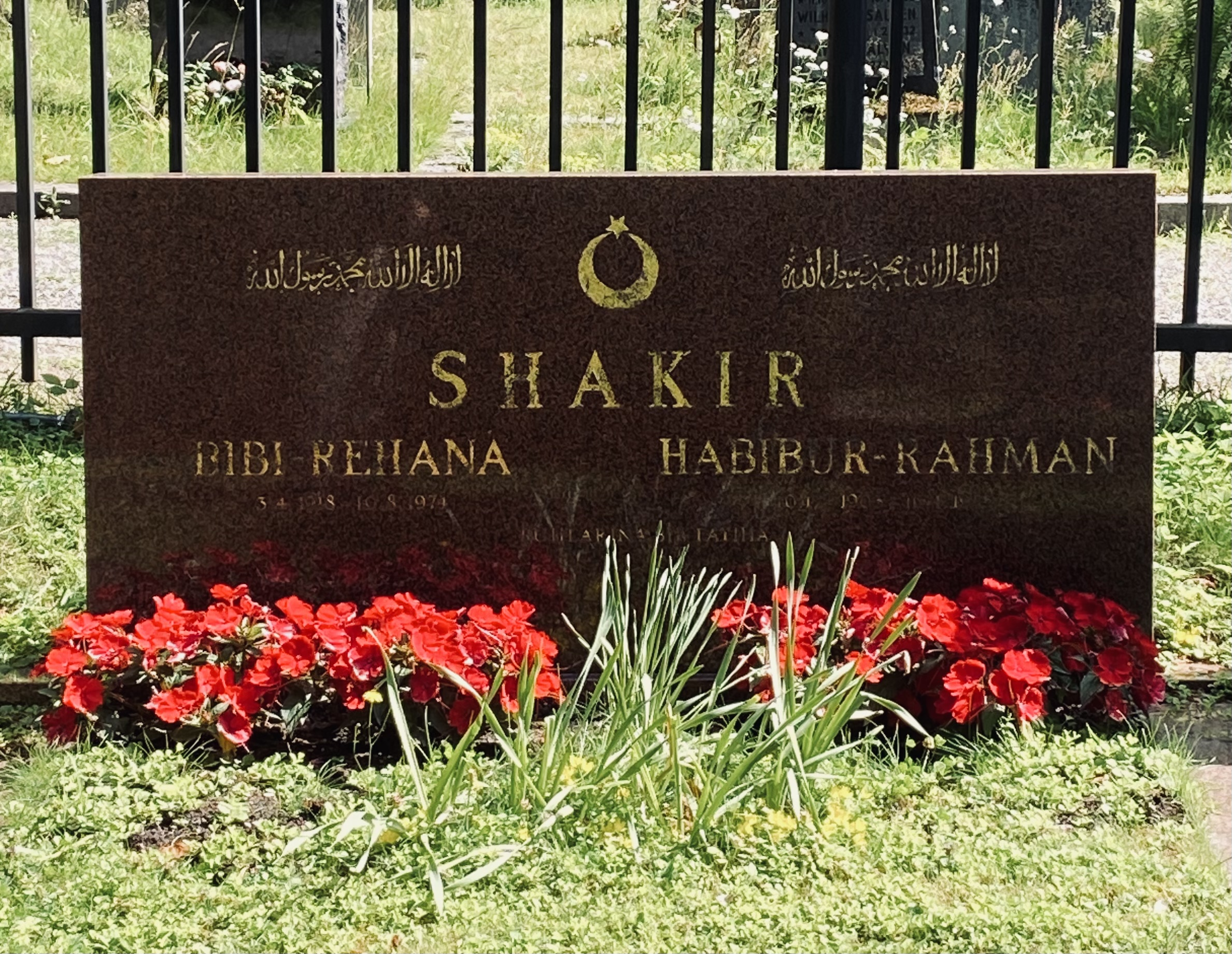
Grave of Habiburrahman and his wife in Helsinki.

Habiburrahman made a pilgrimage to Mecca with his wife in 1972. During the trip, they met the king of Saudi Arabia, who had originally invited them.

Shakir died in Tampere and he is buried with his wife at the Helsinki Islamic Cemetery. They had eight children; Mohammed-Said, Rizaetdin, Saide, Raziye, Shihabetdin, Hamide, Kerime and Sabire. Daughter Hamide (Çaydam) is a Tatar language teacher.

== Some publications ==
Spelling varies greatly. (Originally in Arabic script).

- Finlandiyä İslām Mäğälläse (1949-; Shakir / Fatih Arat)
- Törek ïruģlarï (1950; Shakir / Zuhur Tahir)
- Islam mecellesı (1950-1951; Shakir / Ymär Sali)
- Din derésleré ve Islam tarihçesé (1962; Shakir / Semiulla Wafin)
- Abdulla Tukay (1966 / 1969; Shakir / Aisa Hakimcan)
- Šarä'it al-īmān (1966; Shakir / Hadice Arifulla)

== Sources ==
- Baibulat, Muazzez: Tampereen Islamilainen Seurakunta: juuret ja historia. Gummerus Kirjapaino Oy, 2004. ISBN 952-91-6753-9.
- Bedretdin, Kadriye: Tugan Tel: Kirjoituksia Suomen Tataareista. Suomen Itämainen Seura, 2011. ISBN 978-951-9380-78-0.
