= Tampere Tatar Congregation =

Islamic congregation of Finnish Tatars

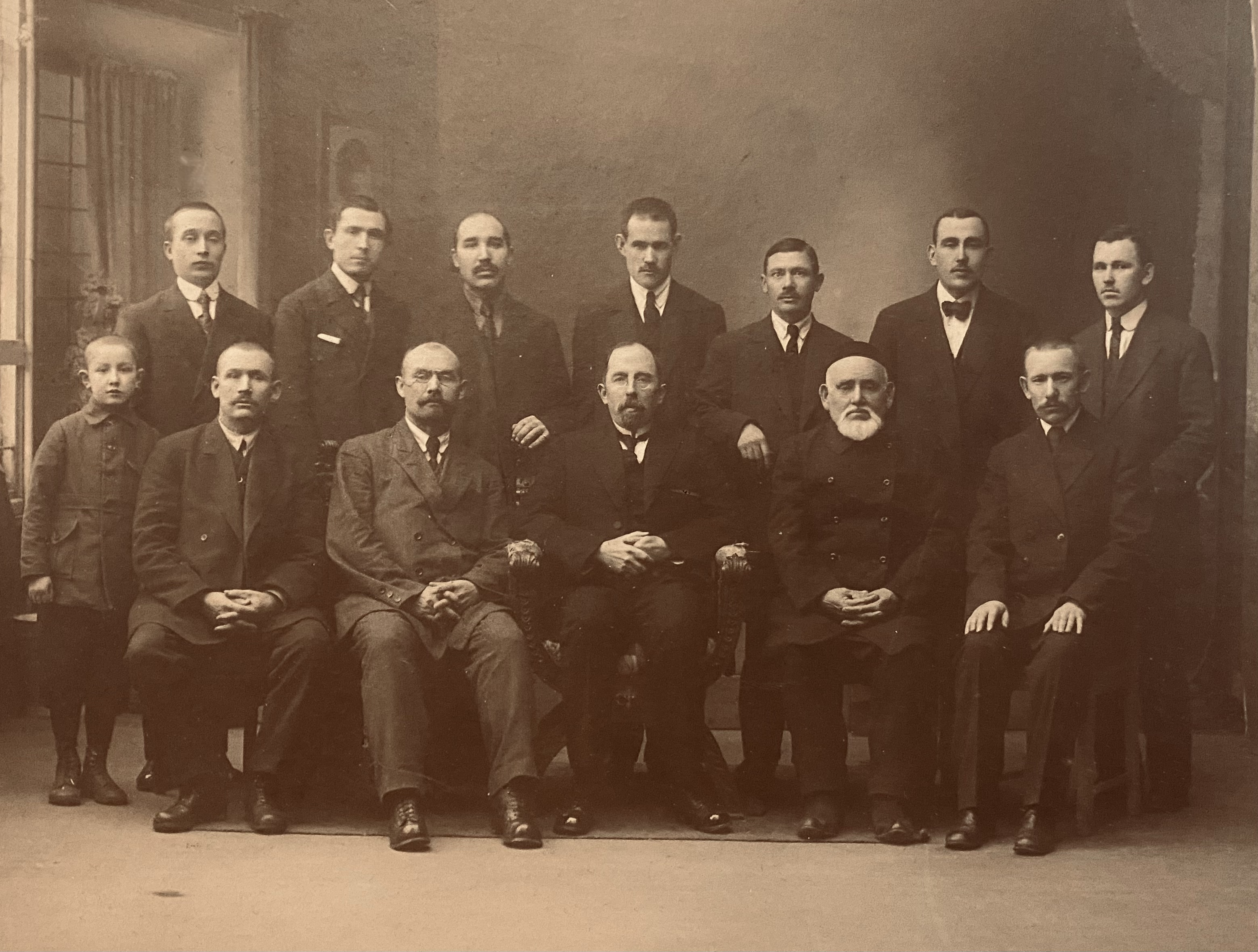
Sadri Maksudi (middle) with Tatars of Tampere in 1920

The Tampere Tatar Congregation (Finnish: Tampereen tataariseurakunta, formerly the Tampere Islamic Congregation, Tampereen islamilainen seurakunta) is an islamic congregation of local Tatars in the city of Tampere, Finland. Its facilities are located on the street Hämeenkatu. It was founded in 1943.

== History ==
The early generations of Tatars in Tampere had a long-time wish to establish their own congregation in their city, through which they could get together to pray, operate their own school education and in general, maintain their language and culture. Before establishing the congregation, Tatars in Tampere belonged to Suomen muhamettilainen seurakunta (The Finnish Mohammedan Congregation). It later became The Finnish Islamic Congregation (Finnish: Suomen Islam-seurakunta), which has its main building in Fredrikinkatu, Helsinki. Also, The Tampere Turkish Society (Tampereen Turkkilainen Yhdistys) was important for them during those times.

In October 1942, they bought a space in Satakunnankatu 4 (a street in Tampere). The Tampere Islamic Congregation was registered in 1943.

A big financial contributor and the first chairman was a Tatar-businessman named Ymär Sali. The most notable imam of the congregation was Habiburrahman Shakir.

The name was changed to The Tampere Tatar Congregation (Tampereen tataariseurakunta) in 2019. Its official address is Hämeenkatu 29 A 9.

== Cemeteries ==
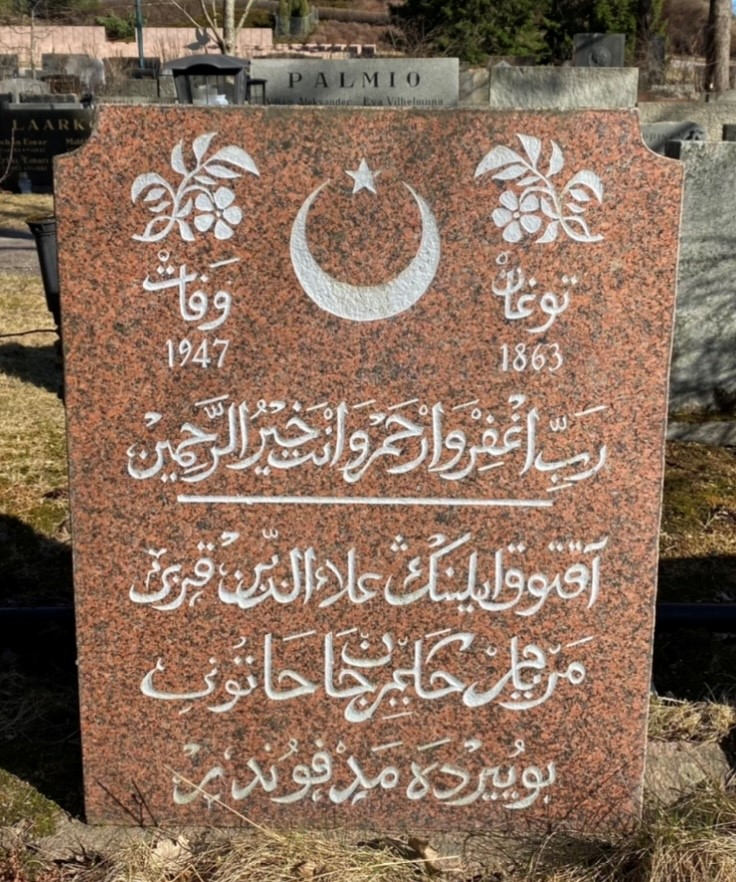
Tatar tombstone in Kalevankangas cemetery

The congregation has two rows for the deceased of their community: one in Kalevankangas Cemetery (in Tampere), other in Vatiala Cemetery (in Kangasala).

== List of chairmen ==
- Vahit Wafin (2014–present)
- Altan Kaader (2010–2013)
- Esad Baibulat (1984–2010)
- Semiulla Wafin (1951–1983)
- Ymär Sali (1943–1951)
