= Ayaz İshaki =

Tatar writer, journalist, and politician (1878–1954)

- عیاض اسحاقی; Гаяз Исхакый
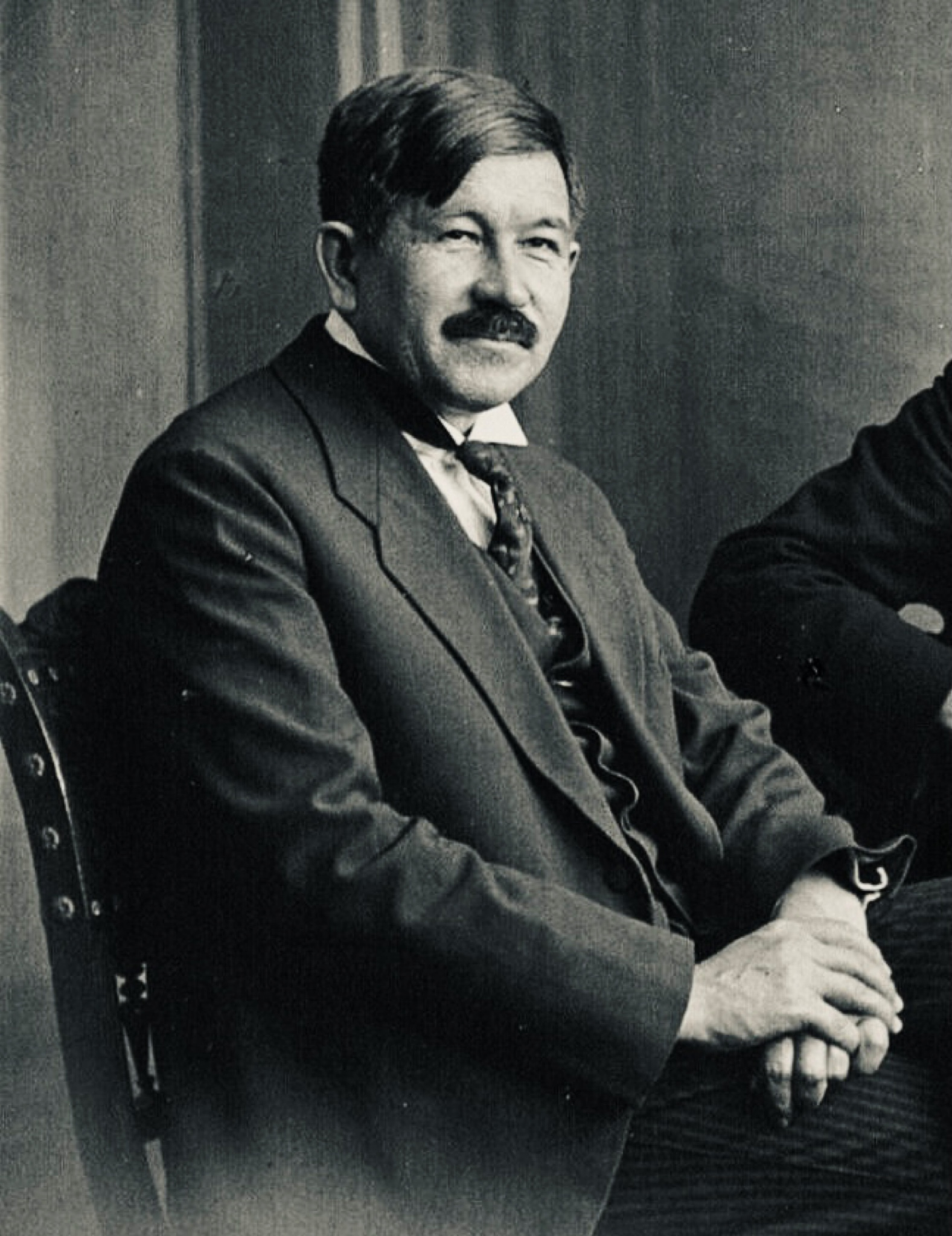
- Ğayaz İsxaqi
- Born: Möxəmmətğayaz Ğiləcetdin ulı İsxaqi; 22 February 1878; Yaushirma, Kazan Governorate, Russian Empire (now Tatarstan, Russia)
- Died: 22 July 1954 (aged 76); Turkey
- Other names: Muhammed Ayaz İshakî İdilli; Ğäyaz İsxaqi
- Relatives: Saadet Çağatay (daughter)
- Website: isxaki.com (eng)

Muhammed Ayaz İshaki (Tatar: Möxəmmətğayaz Ğiləcetdin ulı İsxaqi (Note: Also spelled İshakıy; Tatar Cyrillic: Мөхәммәтгаяз Гыиләҗетдин улы Исхакый) (Tatar pronunciation: [mø̞.χæ.mæt.ʁɑˈjɑz ʁi.læ.ʑetˈtin uˈlɤ̞ is.χɑˈqi]); 22 February [O.S. 10 February] 1878 — 22 July 1954) was a leading figure of the Tatar national movement, author, journalist, publisher and politician.

The importance of İshaki to Tatar literature has been compared to what Pushkin and Tolstoy are to Russians. The most known story of İshaki's is the dystopian "Extinction in 200 years" (200 yıldan soñ inqiraz, Kazan 1904). Among the plays often revered is "Zuleiha" (Zöləyxa, 1917), which focuses on forced baptism of his people.

İshaki was the secretary of state of the short lived Idel-Ural State (1918). While he notably stated that "Russia is a prison of nations", he also (based on his early writings) felt that the so called national problem of the Tatars was largely their own fault; .."[a people] threatened with complete extinction due to their reluctance to follow progress, the Russian culture and renew their centuries-old customs". İshaki himself was heavily influenced by Russian authors and aligned with the Jadid movement. According to researcher Azat Akhunov, İshaki believed that the progress of the Tatar nation was possible only in close cooperation with the Russian world, primarily its enlightened part. While living in İstanbul, İshaki actively corresponded with Maxim Gorky, who wanted to translate his works into Russian.

Ayaz İshaki's daughter was the Turkologist Saadet Çağatay.

== Biography ==
İsxaqi (Iskhakov) was born in 1878 in the village of Yaushirma near Kazan to a Mishar Tatar parents, father Ğiləcetdin and mother Qaməriyə. İshaki was homeschooled by his father at an early age and was sent to study in a madrasa (religious school). He continued his education at the Russian-Tatar teachers' school (1898–1902).

İshaki moved to Kazan in 1904, where he became acquainted ithsocialists and adopted some of their views. He became involved in revolutionary activities, participated in an all-Muslim congress in 1905 and subsequently was arrested and sent to a prison near the city of Arkhangelsk in northern Russia in 1907.

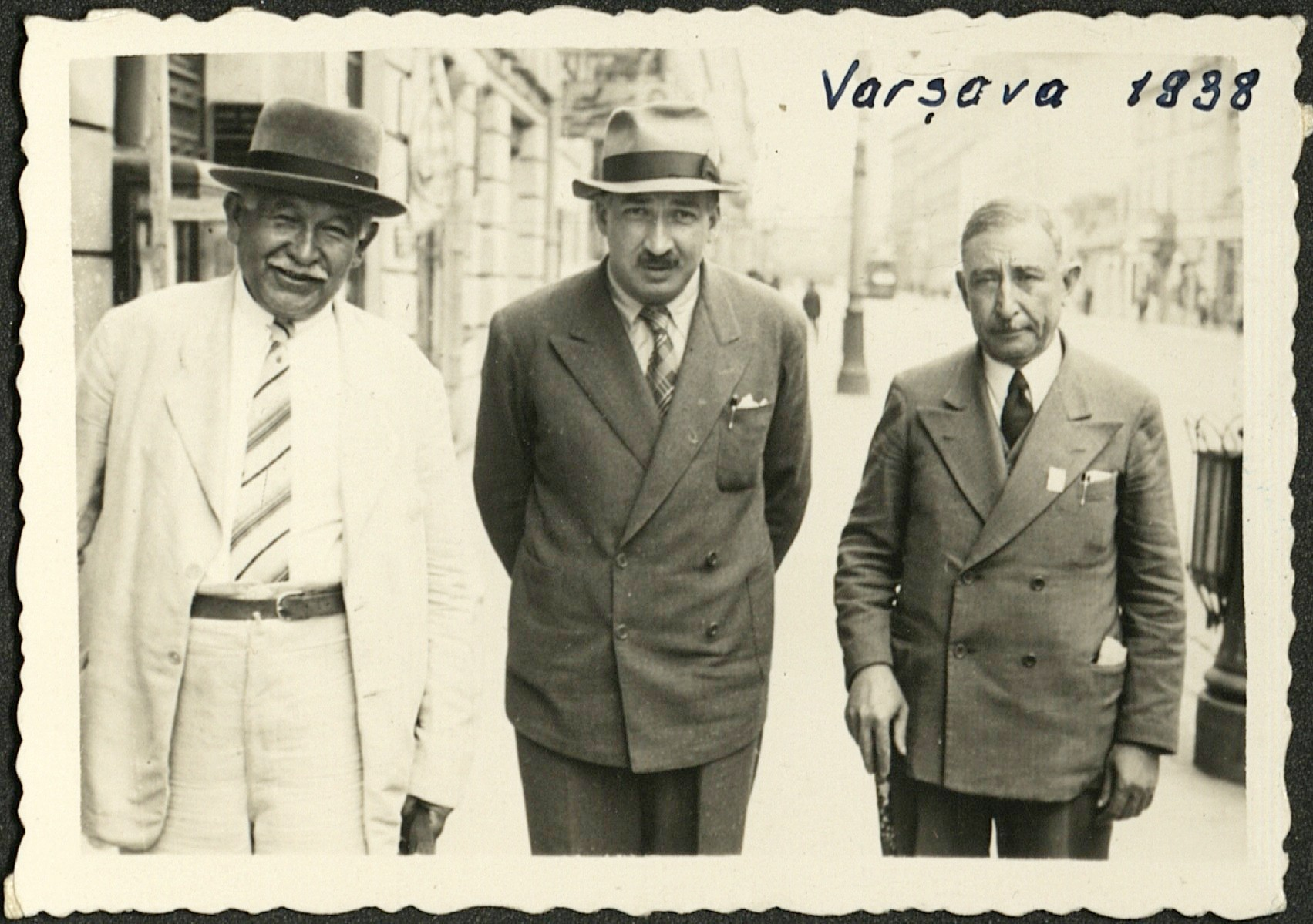
Ayaz İshaki, Said Şamil and Osman Kocaoğlu in Warsaw in 1938

After the February Revolution of 1917, he was involved in activities aimed at achieving cultural autonomy for the Volga Tatars and other Turkic peoples of Russia. As a result of his activities, the Soviet authorities started a campaign of harassment and persecution against him and his associates. He was forced to emigrate in 1920. After settling in Germany, İshaki started publishing a Tatar-language magazine, Milli Yul ("The Way of the Nation") in 1928. In 1931, he presided over the Independence Committee of the Muslims in Idel Ural.

In 1939, the magazine was closed and İshaki decided to immigrate to Turkey. After World War II, he became involved in political activities. At this stage, his main goal was the restoration of the Tatar nationhood lost in 1552 when the Kazan Khanate was defeated and occupied by the Moscow Principality.

Throughout his life, İshaki traveled to Poland, Germany, Japan, China and Turkey where he tried to establish a Tatar-language press and unite disparate Tatar émigré communities. In Finland, he spent time especially among the Tatar community of Tampere during the 1930s. When İshaki organized a memorial service for Idel-Ural State in Warsaw, a few Finnish Tatars took part; among them Aisa Hakimcan and Gibadulla Murtasin.

Ayaz İshaki died in 1954 and was buried in Edirnekapı graveyard in Istanbul.

== Bibliography ==
- İsxaqıy, Ğayaz. Äsärlär unbiş tomda. Edited by M. Kh. (Mansur Khasanovich) Khasanov. Kazan: Tatarstan kitap näşriäte, 1998.
- Kamaliyeva, Alsu. Romantik Milliyetçi Ayaz İshakî. Ankara: Yayınları, 2009.
- Muhammed Ayaz İshaki: Hayatı Ve Faaliyeti, 100. Doğum Yılı Dolayısıyla. Ankara: Ayyıldız Matbaası, 1979.
- Säxapov, Äxmät. Ğayaz İsxaqıy : načalny etap tvorčestva : monografija. Kazań: Master Line, 2003.
- ———. İshaki i tatarskaja literatura XX veka. Kazań: PIK Dom Piečati, 2003.
- Ахунов, Азат М. “Гаяз Исхаки «Кто он? Кто он, кто нашу нацию взрастил?»." Татарский мир, 2004, №3. https://web.archive.org/web/20180322003928/http://www.tatworld.ru/article.shtml?article=489&section=0&heading=0.
- Сахапов, Минахмет Ж. Золотая эпоха татарского ренессанса. Казань: Таткнигиздат, 2004.
