= Aktuk =

Village in Russia

Coordinates: 55°22′38″N 45°38′17″E

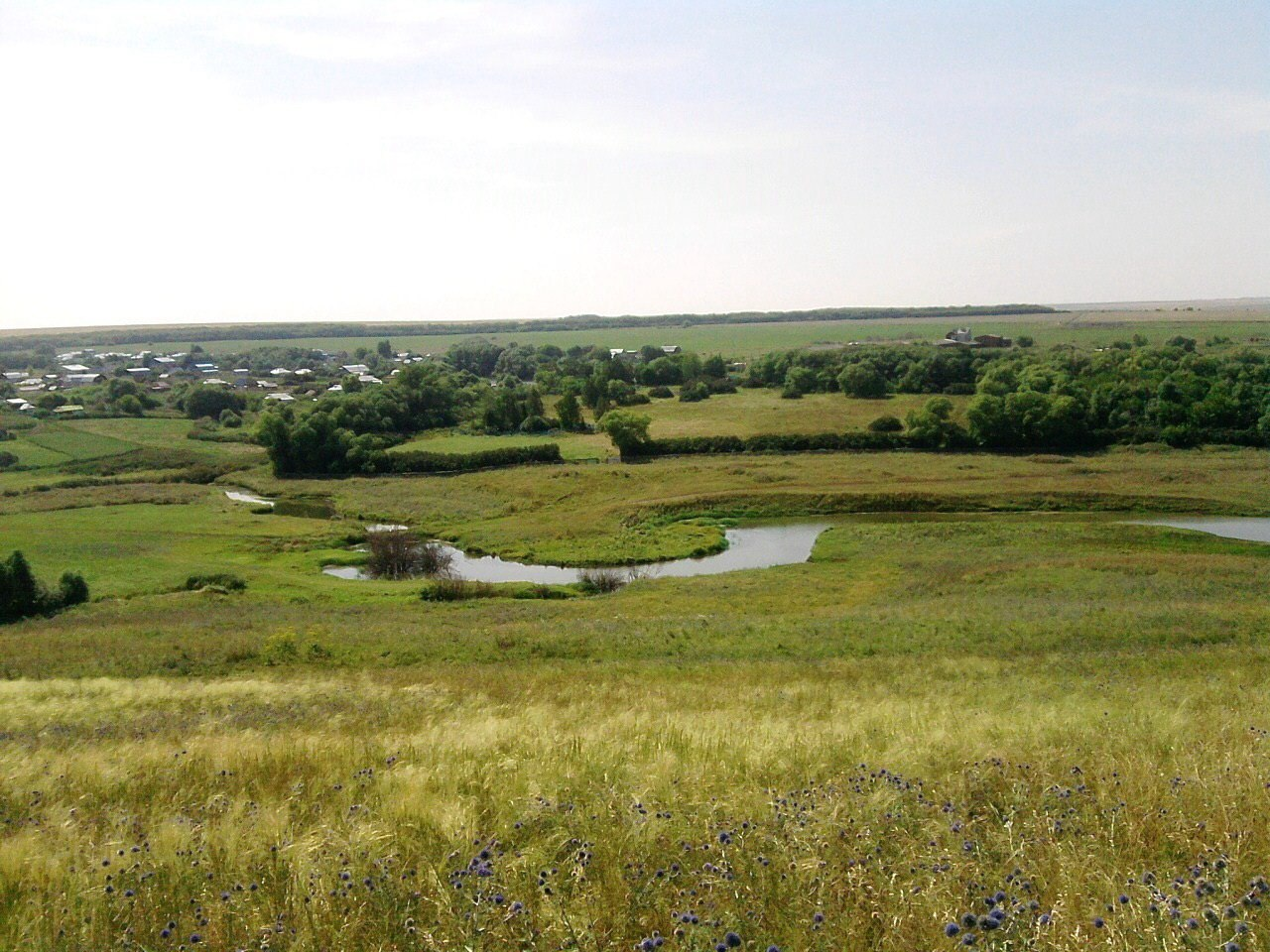
Aktuk, year 2018.

Aktuk (Актук, آقتوق, Aqtuq / Aktök; Russian: Акту́ково, romanized: Aktukovo; aka Yañapar, Яңапар) is a Mishar Tatar village in Krasnooktyabrsky District, Nizhny Novgorod Oblast, Russia. Most ancestors of Finnish Tatars were from Aktuk.

== History ==
The village is believed to be founded in 1640s. Its name comes from Aktuk (Aktök), the leader of the village, who either himself, or his family, came from Temnikov principality (Tömän). In 1674, the village was led by the son of Aktuk, Mamedeley Aktukov (Mämät-Ali, Möxämmät-Ali).

Before the village of Aktuk, there was a settlement of Temnikov's service Tatar families called Par / Para in the area, which eventually formed the neighboring villages, that today are known as Aktuk, and for example, Urazovka (Urazawıl). At the beginning of the 17th century, the leader of Par village was Utesh (Öteş) Sudeyarov, who is said to have been Aktuk's father. In the "supplementary watch list" of Temnikov, there are references to brothers Utesh and Kuzma Sudeyarov as the owners of estates in Temnikovsky district.

Aktuk is also known as Yañapar, which means "New Par" (Russian: Новопара, Novopara). Par is also the name of the river that flows through the village. It has been suggested to come from the Mordvan language, but Alimzhan Orlov, among others, rejects this, stating that the word is "one of the oldest and most widespread words in the languages of the Turkic peoples". According to linguist Vasily Radlov, it means "inheritance, share, property". According to Orlov, the archaeological monument of the village, "Torataş" (also Тараташ / Такташ, Taratash, Taktaş) shows that the lands in question were pastures of the ancient Turks. Some scholars have proposed that Par was a village already inhabited by Turkic peoples in the 16th century, which the new arrivals became part of and enlarged. The Tatar dialect in Sergachsky district is said to be "faithfully close" to the ancient Kipchak-Turkic language. According to tradition, battles between the Golden Horde Tatars and Mordovians took place in these areas.

== Population ==
According to the 2002 census, 94% of the village's inhabitants were Tatars. In 2010, the number of inhabitants was 253.

Notable Tatar singer Rashid Vagapov was born in this village.
