= Tunisia men's national volleyball team =

Men's national volleyball team representing Tunisia

Tunisia
- Nickname(s): نسور قرطاج (Eagles of Carthage)
- Association: Tunisian Volleyball Federation
- Confederation: CAVB
- Head coach: (Italy) Camillo Placì
- FIVB ranking: 31 (15 October 2026)

Uniforms
Home	Away	Third

Summer Olympics
- Appearances: 7 (First in 1972)
- Best result: 9th (1984)

World Championship
- Appearances: 12 (First in 1962)
- Best result: 12th (2025)

World Cup
- Appearances: 9 (First in 1969)
- Best result: 8th (1981, 1991)

African Championship
- Appearances: 23 (First in 1967)
- Best result: (1967, 1971, 1979, 1987, 1995, 1997, 1999, 2003, 2017, 2019, 2021, 2026)
- ftvb.org
Honours
Event	1st	2nd	3rd
African Championship	12	7	2
Arab Championship	8	2	1
Mediterranean Games	0	2	0
All-Africa Games	1	3	1
Arab Games	3	0	1
Afro-Arab Championship	1	0	0
Arab Volleyball Challenge Cup	1	0	0
Maghreb Championship	7	0	0
Total	33	14	5
Medal record
African Championship
Gold medal – first place	1967 Tunis	
Gold medal – first place	1971 Cairo	
Gold medal – first place	1979 Tripoli	
Gold medal – first place	1987 Tunis	
Gold medal – first place	1995 Tunis	
Gold medal – first place	1997 Lagos	
Gold medal – first place	1999 Cairo	
Gold medal – first place	2003 Cairo	
Gold medal – first place	2017 Cairo	
Gold medal – first place	2019 Tunis	
Gold medal – first place	2021 Kigali	
Gold medal – first place	2026 Tunis	
Silver medal – second place	1976 Tunis	
Silver medal – second place	1983 Port Said	
Silver medal – second place	1993 Alger	
Silver medal – second place	2005 Cairo	
Silver medal – second place	2007 Durban	
Silver medal – second place	2013 Sousse	
Silver medal – second place	2015 Cairo	
Bronze medal – third place	1991 Cairo	
Bronze medal – third place	2011 Tangier	
All-Africa Games
Gold medal – first place	1978 Algiers	
Silver medal – second place	1965 Brazzaville	
Silver medal – second place	1973 Lagos	
Silver medal – second place	2007 Algiers	
Bronze medal – third place	1991 Cairo	
Arab Championship
Gold medal – first place	1980 Damascus	
Gold medal – first place	1984 Tunis	
Gold medal – first place	1988 Riyadh	
Gold medal – first place	1996 Cairo	
Gold medal – first place	2000 Amman	
Gold medal – first place	2002 Amman	
Gold medal – first place	2006 Manama	
Gold medal – first place	2012 Manama	
Silver medal – second place	2002 Amman	
Silver medal – second place	2008 Manama	
Bronze medal – third place	1994 Manama	
Arab Games
Gold medal – first place	1957 Beirut	
Gold medal – first place	1985 Rabat	
Gold medal – first place	1999 Amman	
Bronze medal – third place	2004 Algiers	
Arab Volleyball Challenge Cup
Gold medal – first place	2025 Amman	
Mediterranean Games
Silver medal – second place	2001 Tunis	
Silver medal – second place	2013 Mersin	
Maghreb Volleyball Championship
Gold medal – first place	1967 Tunis	
Gold medal – first place	1968 Tunis	
Gold medal – first place	1969 Algiers	
Gold medal – first place	1970 Rabat	
Gold medal – first place	1971 Tunis	
Gold medal – first place	1972 Rabat	
Gold medal – first place	1973 Algiers	
Afro-Arab Volleyball Friendship Cup
Gold medal – first place	1981 Kuwait	

The Tunisia men's national volleyball team (Arabic: منتخب تونس للكرة الطائرة), nicknamed the Eagles of Carthage, represents Tunisia in men's international volleyball, and is governed by the Tunisian Volleyball Federation (FTVB), the governing body of volleyball in Tunisia. It has been a member of FIVB since 1956 and is a member of the African Volleyball Confederation. Tunisia is the most successful team in Africa and the Arab world, thanks to its championship titles and records.

Internationally, the team has qualify in seven editions of the Summer Olympic volleyball tournament, beginning with the 1972 Games in Munich; their best result was a ninth-place finish at the 1984 Games in Los Angeles. Tunisia has qualified for the FIVB Men's Volleyball World Cup twelve times, beginning with the 1962 edition in the Soviet Union, a tournament from which the team withdrew after playing three matches, having refused to face Israel. The team has not missed the championship since 2002, and it achieved its best-ever result in both 2022 and 2025 by reaching the round of 16. Tunisia participated ten times in the now-defunct World Cup, beginning in 1969; the team achieved its best ranking in the 1981 and 1991 editions, finishing in eighth place. The team participated in the FIVB Volleyball World League four times beginning in 2014; but failed to achieve any notable results, as they were eliminated in the group stage on every occasion. Tunisia qualified for the FIVB Men's Volleyball Challenger Cup twice, in 2022 and 2023, reaching the quarter-finals on both occasions.

At the African level, Tunisia has participated in the Men's African Nations Volleyball Championship 23 times; it was part of the inaugural edition, held on its own soil in 1967, in which it won the title. Throughout its long history in the tournament, the team has secured the title a record 12 times in 1967, 1971, 1979, 1987, 1995, 1997, 1999, 2003, 2017, 2019, 2021, and 2026, while finishing as runner-up in 1976, 1983, 1993, 2005, 2007, 2013, 2015, and taking third place in 1991 and 2011. Tunisia has participated in the African Games five times, winning a gold medal once in 1978, a silver medal three times in 1965, 1973 and 2007, and a bronze medal once in 1991.

At the Arab level, Tunisia is also the most successful team in the Arab Volleyball Championship, having won the title a record eight times in 1980, 1984, 1988, 1996, 2000, 2002, 2006, and 2012. They finished second in 1998 and 2008, and third in 1994 and 2024. Tunisia is also the most successful team in the Arab Games, having won the bronze medal three times in 1957, 1985, and 1999 as well as another bronze medal in 2004. Tunisia won the only Arab Volleyball Challenge Cup title, from the inaugural edition held in 2025.

At the Maghreb level, Tunisia won all seven titles of the Maghreb Championship in 1967, 1968, 1969, 1970, 1971, 1972, and 1973. Tunisia won the only edition of the Afro-Arab Volleyball Friendship Cup in 1981. Outside of its own continent, Tunisia participated once in the Men's European Volleyball Championship in 1958, finishing in sixteenth place.

== Results ==
=== Olympic Games ===
Olympic Games record
Year	Round	Rank	GP	MW	ML	SW	SL
(Japan) 1964	Did not qualify						
(Mexico) 1968	Withdrew						
(West Germany) 1972	Preliminary round	12th	6	0	6	1	18
(Canada) 1976	Did not qualify						
(Soviet Union) 1980	Withdrew						
(United States) 1984	Preliminary round	9th	5	1	4	3	14
(South Korea) 1988	Preliminary round	12th	7	0	7	0	21
(Spain) 1992	Did not qualify						
(United States) 1996	Preliminary round	11th	5	0	5	1	15
(Australia) 2000	Did not qualify						
(Greece) 2004	Preliminary round	11th	5	0	5	4	15
(China) 2008	Did not qualify						
(United Kingdom) 2012	Preliminary round	11th	5	0	5	1	15
(Brazil) 2016	Did not qualify						
(Japan) 2020	Preliminary round	11th	5	0	5	3	15
(France) 2024	Did not qualify						
(United States) 2028	Qualified						
(Australia) 2032	To be determined						
Total	Preliminary round	7/17	38	1	37	13	113

=== World Championship ===
FIVB World Championships record
Year	Round	Rank	GP	MW	ML	SW	SL
(Czechoslovakia) 1949	Did not enter						
(Soviet Union) 1952	Did not enter						
(France) 1956	Did not enter						
(Brazil) 1960	Did not enter						
(Soviet Union) 1962	Withdrew		4	1	3	3	12
(Czechoslovakia) 1966	Did not enter						
(Bulgaria) 1970	Group stages	22nd	11	3	8	11	28
(Mexico) 1974	Group stages	18th	11	3	8	12	28
(Italy) 1978	Group stages	24th	9	0	9	0	27
(Argentina) 1982	Group stages	21st	9	3	6	11	20
(France) 1986	Did not qualify						
(Brazil) 1990	Did not qualify						
(Greece) 1994	Did not qualify						
(Japan) 1998	Did not qualify						
(Argentina) 2002	Group stages	19th	3	0	3	2	9
(Japan) 2006	Second round	15th	9	3	6	15	22
(Italy) 2010	Group stages	19th	3	0	3	1	9
(Poland) 2014	Group stages	21st	5	0	5	4	15
(Italy) (Bulgaria) 2018	Group stages	23rd	5	0	5	2	15
(Poland) (Slovenia) 2022	Round of 16	16th	4	1	3	3	9
(Philippines) 2025	Round of 16	12th	4	2	2	7	6
(Poland) 2027	Qualified						
(Qatar) 2029	To be determined						
Total	Round of 16	12/22	77	16	61	71	200

=== World Cup ===
World Cup record
Year	Round	Rank	GP	MW	ML	SW	SL
(Japan) 1965	Did not qualify						
(East Germany) 1969		11th	6	0	6	0	18
(Japan) 1977	Did not qualify						
(Japan) 1981		8th	7	0	7	1	21
(Japan) 1985	Did not qualify						
(Japan) 1989	Did not qualify						
(Japan) 1991		8th	8	4	4	13	16
(Japan) 1995		12th	11	0	11	2	33
(Japan) 1999		12th	11	0	11	5	33
(Japan) 2003		11th	11	2	9	9	30
(Japan) 2007		12th	11	1	10	12	32
(Japan) 2011	Did not qualify						
(Japan) 2015		12th	11	0	11	5	33
(Japan) 2019		12th	11	1	10	6	31
Total		10/15	85	8	86	55	242

=== World League ===
World League record
Year	Round	Rank	GP	MW	ML	SW	SL
(Japan) 1990	1990 to 2013 Did not participate						
(Argentina) 2013	1990 to 2013 Did not participate						
(Italy) 2014	G3 GS	27th	6	1	5	6	17
(Brazil) 2015	G3 GS	30th	6	1	5	5	16
(Poland) 2016	G3 GS	33rd	6	3	3	10	13
(Brazil) 2017	G3 GS	30th	6	4	2	15	12
Total		4/28	24	9	15	36	58

=== Challenger Cup ===
FIVB Challenger Cup record
Year	Round	Rank	GP	MW	ML	SW	SL
(Portugal) 2018	Did not enter						
(Slovenia) 2019	Did not enter						
(Portugal) 2020	Canceled due to COVID-19 pandemic						
(Portugal) 2021	Canceled due to COVID-19 pandemic						
(South Korea) 2022	Quarter-finals	6th	1	0	1	1	3
(Qatar) 2023	Quarter-finals	8th	1	0	1	0	3
(China) 2024	Did not qualify						
Total	Quarter-finals	2/5	2	0	2	1	6

=== African Championship ===
African Volleyball Championship record
Year	Round	Rank	GP	MW	ML	SW	SL
(Tunisia) 1967	Champions	1st	3	3	0	15	0
(Egypt) 1971	Champions	1st	5	5	0	15	3
(Tunisia) 1976	Runners-up	2nd	5	4	1	13	4
(Libya) 1979	Champions	1st	3	3	0	15	0
(Egypt) 1983	Runners-up	2nd	6	5	1	16	6
(Tunisia) 1987	Champions	1st	5	5	0	15	2
(Ivory Coast) 1989	Did not compete						
(Egypt) 1991	Third place	3rd	5	3	2	13	6
(Algeria) 1993	Runners-up	2nd	5	4	1	12	5
(Tunisia) 1995	Champions	1st	5	5	0	15	2
(Nigeria) 1997	Champions	1st	5	5	0	15	2
(Egypt) 1999	Champions	1st	4	4	0	12	2
(Nigeria) 2001	Did not compete						
(Egypt) 2003	Champions	1st	5	4	1	13	4
(Egypt) 2005	Runners-up	2nd	6	5	1	16	6
(South Africa) 2007	Runners-up	2nd	6	5	1	17	3
(Morocco) 2009	Group stages	5th	6	4	2	13	7
(Morocco) 2011	Third place	3rd	5	3	2	11	7
(Tunisia) 2013	Runners-up	2nd	5	4	1	13	8
(Egypt) 2015	Runners-up	2nd	6	4	2	14	9
(Egypt) 2017	Champions	1st	6	6	0	18	4
(Tunisia) 2019	Champions	1st	6	6	0	18	3
(Rwanda) 2021	Champions	1st	6	6	0	18	2
(Egypt) 2023	Quarter-finals	5th	7	6	1	19	3
(Tunisia) 2026	Champions	1st	5	5	0	15	1
Total	12 Titles	23/24	114	98	16	326	88

=== African Games ===
African Games record
Year	Round	Rank	GP	MW	ML	SW	SL
(Republic of the Congo) 1965	Runners-up	2nd	5	4	1	11	5
(Mali) 1969	Disrupted by military coup						
(Nigeria) 1973	Runners-up	2nd	5	4	1	12	5
(Algeria) 1978	Champions	1st	5	4	1	13	5
(Kenya) 1987	Did not compete						
(Egypt) 1991	Third place	3rd	5	4	2	7	6
(Zimbabwe) 1995	Did not compete						
(South Africa) 1999	Did not compete						
(Nigeria) 2003	Did not compete						
(Algeria) 2007	Runners-up	2nd	7	5	2	17	8
(Mozambique) 2011	Did not compete						
(Republic of the Congo) 2015	Did not compete						
(Morocco) 2019	Did not compete						
(Ghana) 2023	Did not compete						
Total	1 Title	5/11	27	21	7	60	29

=== Arab Championship ===
Arab Championship record
Year	Round	Rank	GP	MW	ML	SW	SL
(Kuwait) 1977	Did not compete						
(Syria) 1980	Champions	1st					
(Tunisia) 1984	Champions	1st					
(Jordan) 1986	Did not compete						
(Saudi Arabia) 1988	Champions	1st					
(Syria) 1992	Did not compete						
(Bahrain) 1994	Third place	3rd					
(Egypt) 1996	Champions	1st					
(Bahrain) 1998	Runners-up	2nd					
(Jordan) 2000	Champions	1st					
(Jordan) 2002	Champions	1st					
(Bahrain) 2006	Champions	1st	6	5	1	16	8
(Bahrain) 2008	Runners-up	2nd	5	4	1	14	5
(Bahrain) 2012	Champions	1st	5	5	0	15	2
(Kuwait) 2014	Did not compete						
(Egypt) 2016	Did not compete						
(Egypt) 2018	Did not compete						
(Bahrain) 2024	Third place	3rd					
(Jordan) 2026	Did not compete						
Total	8 titles	12/17					

=== Arab Games ===
Arab Games record
Year	Round	Rank	GP	MW	ML	SW	SL
(Lebanon) 1957	Champions	1st					
(Morocco) 1961	Cancelled						
(United Arab Republic) 1965	Did not compete						
(Syria) 1976	Cancelled						
(Morocco) 1985	Champions	1st					
(Syria) 1992	Did not compete						
(Lebanon) 1997	Did not compete						
(Jordan) 1999	Champions	1st					
(Algeria) 2004	Third place	3rd					
(Egypt) 2007	Group stages	5th					
(Qatar) 2011	Did not compete						
(Algeria) 2023	Did not compete						
Total	3 titles	5/10					

=== Arab Volleyball Challenge Cup ===
Arab Volleyball Challenge Cup record
Year	Round	Rank	GP	MW	ML	SW	SL
(Jordan) 2025	Champions	1st	5	5	0	15	0
Total	1 title	1/1	5	5	0	15	0

=== Mediterranean Games ===
Mediterranean Games record
Year	Round	Rank	GP	MW	ML	SW	SL
(Lebanon) 1959	Did not compete						
(Italy) 1963	Did not compete						
(Tunisia) 1967	Did not compete						
(Turkey) 1971	Semi-finals	4th					
(Algeria) 1975	Did not compete						
(Socialist Federal Republic of Yugoslavia) 1979	Did not compete						
(Morocco) 1983	Did not compete						
(Syria) 1987	Group stages	5th					
(Greece) 1991	Did not compete						
(France) 1993	Did not compete						
(Italy) 1997	Did not compete						
(Tunisia) 2001	Runners-up	2nd	5	4	1	13	4
(Spain) 2005	Semi-finals	4th	5	3	2	9	8
(Italy) 2009	Semi-finals	4th	6	3	3	11	10
(Turkey) 2013	Runners-up	2nd	5	3	2	11	8
(Spain) 2018	Quarter-finals	6th	6	2	3	9	10
(Algeria) 2022	Quarter-finals	6th	5	3	2	10	9
(Italy) 2026	Preliminary Round	5th	5	3	2	10	8
Total	Runners-up	9/17	32	18	13	63	49

* Since 2001.

=== Maghreb Volleyball Championship ===
Maghreb Volleyball Championship record
Year	Round	Rank	GP	MW	ML	SW	SL
(Tunisia) 1967	Champions	1st					
(Tunisia) 1968	Champions	1st					
(Algeria) 1969	Champions	1st					
(Morocco) 1970	Champions	1st					
(Tunisia) 1971	Champions	1st					
(Morocco) 1972	Champions	1st					
(Algeria) 1973	Champions	1st					
Total	7 titles	7/7					

=== Others ===
Year	Round	Rank
(Czech Republic) 1958 European Volleyball Championship	Preliminary round	16th
(Uruguay) 1969 Cup of the five continents	Preliminary round	11th
(Kuwait) 1981 Afro-Arab Volleyball Friendship Cup	Champions	1st
2012 Cup of the President of Kazakhstan	Champions	1st
(United Arab Emirates) 2012 Rashed International Tournament	Champions	1st
(Italy) 2023 Torneo Internazionale Del Due Mari	Runner-up	1st
Total	3 titles	6/6

== Staff ==
=== Current staff ===
Nationality	Staff member	Role
Italy	Camillo Placì	Head coach
Tunisia	Ahmed Bida	Statistician
Tunisia	Mohamed Ben Ali	Statistician

=== All Time Head coaches ===
- (Tunisia) Habib Ben Ezzedine (1956–1957)
- (Hungary) Ernö Henning (1957–1960)
- (Socialist Federal Republic of Yugoslavia) Dragoslav Sirotanović (1961–1962)
- (Hungary) Ernö Henning (1962–1967) (2)
- (Czechoslovakia) Josef Brož (1968–1969)
- (Tunisia) Hassine Belkhouja (1970)
- (Czechoslovakia) Gustáv Breznen (1970–1973)
- (Tunisia) Hassine Belkhouja (1973–1978) (2)
- (Tunisia) Mohamed Sellami (1979–1980)
- (Soviet Union) Victor Turin (1981–1984)
- (Tunisia) Hassen Ben Cheikh (1984–1987)
- (Poland) Hubert Wagner (1987–1991)
- (Tunisia) Hassine Belkhouja (1991) (3)
- (Russia) Sergei Alexeyev (1992–1993)
- (Tunisia) Fethi Mkaouer (1994–1996)
- (China) Shen Fu Lin (1997–1998)
- (Netherlands) Stewart Bernard (1998–1999)
- (Italy) Antonio Giacobbe (1999–2007)
- (Bosnia and Herzegovina) Veljko Basić (2008–2009)
- (Tunisia) Fethi Mkaouer (2010–2016)
- (Italy) Antonio Giacobbe (2017–2023)
- (Tunisia) Noureddiine Hfaiedh (2024)
- (Italy) Camillo Placi (2025–present)

== Rosters ==
=== Current roster ===
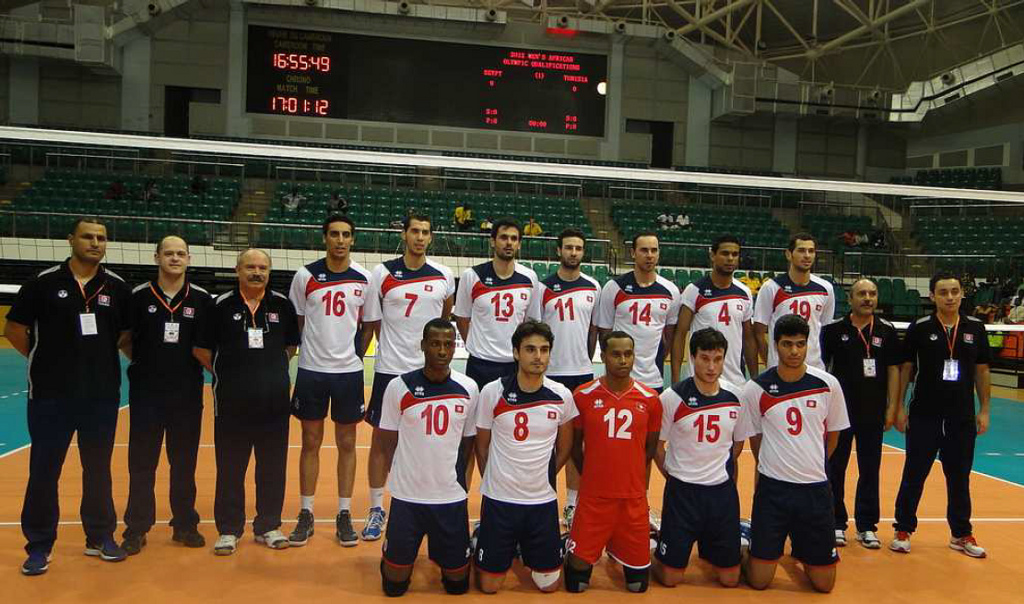
Team roster against Egypt at the 2012 Summer Olympics qualification.

The following is the Tunisian roster in the 2026 Men's African Nations Volleyball Championship in Tunis.

Tunisia national team roster
No.	Player	Position	Height	Birth year	Current club
3	Khaled Ben Slimene	Setter	198 cm	1994	(Libya) Al Ittihad SC
8	Ala Lachaal	Setter	193 cm	—	(Tunisia) Étoile Sportive du Sahel
4	Mohamed Ben Youssef Lasgher	Opposite	192 cm	1997	(Tunisia) Espérance Sportive de Tunis
18	Ali Bongui	Opposite	201 cm	1996	(Tunisia) Club Sportif Sfaxien
7	Elyes Karamosli	Outside hitter	198 cm	1989	(Tunisia) Espérance Sportive de Tunis
9	Hamza Hfaiedh	Outside hitter	192 cm	2002	(Bulgaria) Metalurg Pernik
14	Oussama Ben Romdhane	Outside hitter	194 cm	2002	(France) Tourcoing Lille Métropole
20	Hedi Khazri	Outside hitter	190 cm	2000	(United Arab Emirates) Al Wasl SC
2	Ahmed Kadhi	Middle blocker	199 cm	1989	(Tunisia) Espérance Sportive de Tunis
5	Mahdi Bentaher	Middle blocker	203 cm	2004	(France) Tourcoing Lille Métropole
11	Wajdi Baroudi	Middle blocker	200 cm	2002	(Tunisia) Étoile Sportive du Sahel
13	Selim Mbareki	Middle blocker	200 cm	1999	(Tunisia) Espérance Sportive de Tunis
12	Mohamed Ridene	Libero	180 cm	1996	(Tunisia) Étoile Sportive du Sahel
19	Tayeb Korbosli	Libero	188 cm	1993	(Tunisia) Espérance Sportive de Tunis

=== Past rosters ===
1967 African Championship: finished 1st (gold) among 4 teams

Hassine Belkhouja, Raouf El Bahri, Moncef Ben Soltane, Belaid Raissi, Moncef Hadded, Naceur Bounatouf, Raja Hayder, Fathi Caid Sebsi, Sami El Bahri, Mokhtar El Karoui, Hedi Boulila (Coach: Josef Brož)

1971 African Championship: finished 1st (gold) among 8 teams

Naceur Ben Othman, Samir Lamouchi, Abdelaziz Bousarsar, Noureddin Ben Slimane, Sgaer, Hedi Ben Sedrin, Wael Behi, Naceur Bounatouf, Hamouda Ben Massaoud, Raja Hayder, Moncef Ben Soltane, Mohamed Ben Sheikh (Coach: Gustáv Breznen).

1972 Summer Olympics: finished 12th among 12 teams

1 Oueil Behi Mohamed, 2 Mohamed Ben Sheikh, 3 Moncef Ben Soltane, 4 Samir Lamouchi, 5 Hamouda Ben Massaoud, 6 Raja Hayder, 7 Abdel Aziz Derbal, 8 Naceur Bounatouf, 10 Abdel Aziz Bousarsar, 11 Rafik Ben Amor; 12 Naceur Ben Othman (Coach: Gustáv Breznen).

1984 Summer Olympics: finished 9th among 10 teams

1 Faycal Laridhi, 2 Mohamed Sarsar, 3 Rashid Bousarsar, 4 Razi Mhiri, 5 Msaddak Lahmar, 6 Mounir Barek, 7 Walid Boulahya, 8 Slim Mehrizi, 9 Chebbi Mbarek, 10 Yassine Mezlini, 11 Abdel Aziz Ben Abdallah, (Coach: Victor Turin).

1988 Summer Olympics: finished 12th among 12 teams

1 Mourad Tebourski, 2 Rashid Bousarsar, 3 Abdel Aziz Ben Abdallah, 4 Hedi Bousarsar, 5 Abderrazak Ben Massaoud, 6 Msaddak Lahmar, 7 Raouf Chenoufi, 8 Faycal Ben Amara, 9 Mohamed Sarsar, 10 Lotfi Ben Slimane, 11 Hichem Ben Amira, 12 Fethi Ghariani (Coach: Hubert Wagner).

1996 Summer Olympics: finished 11th among 12 teams

1 Ghazi Koubba, 2 Riadh Hedhili, 3 Mohamed Baghdadi, 7 Riadh Ghandri, 8 Atif Loukil, 9 Khaled Belaïd, 10 Hichem Ben Romdhane, 11 Tarek Aouni,12 Faycal Ben Amara, 13 Noureddine Hfaiedh, 15 Ghazi Guidara, 17 Majdi Toumi (Coach: Fethi Mkaouer).

2002 World Championship: finished 19th among 24 teams

1 Mohamed Trabelsi, 3 Mehdi Gara, 5 Samir Sellami, 7 Chaker Ghezal, 9 Khaled Belaïd, 10 Walid Ben Abbes, 11 Marouane Fehri, 13 Noureddine Hfaiedh, 14 Mehrez Berriri, 17 Walid Ben Cheikh, 18 Hosni Karamosly (Coach: Antonio Giacobbe).

2003 World Cup: finished 11th among 12 teams

2 Mohamed Trabelsi, 3 Mehdi Gara, 5 Samir Sellami, 7 Chaker Ghezal, 9 Khaled Belaïd, 10 Oualid Ben Abbes, 11 Marouan Fehri, 13 Noureddine Hfaiedh, 14 Mehrez Berriri, 15 Ghazi Guidara (C), 16 Tarek Sammari, 18 Hosni Karamosly (Coach: Antonio Giacobbe).

2004 Summer Olympics: finished 11th among 12 teams

2 Mohamed Trabelsi, 3 Mehdi Gara, 4 Walid Ben Abbes, 5 Samir Sellami, 7 Chaker Ghezal, 9 Khaled Belaïd, 11 Marouane Fehri, 13 Noureddine Hfaiedh, 14 Mehrez Berriri, 15 Ghazi Guidara (C), 17 Mohammed Slim Chekili, 18 Hosni Karamosly (Coach: Antonio Giacobbe).

2006 World Championship: finished 15th among 24 teams

2 Mohamed Trabelsi, 3 Skander Ben Tara, 5 Samir Sellami, 6 Aymen Ben Brik, 7 Chaker Ghezal, 9 Khaled Belaïd, 10 Walid Ben Abbes, 13 Noureddine Hfaiedh, 15 Ghazi Guidara, 16 Hichem Kaabi, 17 Amine Besrour, 18 Hosni Karamosly (Coach: Antonio Giacobbe).

2007 World Cup: finished 11th among 12 teams

1 Amine Besrour, 3 Skander Ben Tara, 4 Marouane Garci, 8 Aymen Ben Brik, 9 Khaled Belaïd, 10 Haykel Jerbi, 12 Hichem Kaabi, 13 Noureddine Hfaiedh, 14 Bilel Ben Hassine, 15 Ghazi Guidara, 16 Chokri Jouini, 18 Hosni Karamosly (Coach: Antonio Giacobbe).

2009 African Championship: finished 5th among 9 teams

3 Saifeddine El Majid, 4 Marouen Garci, 5 Chokri Jouini, 6 Skander Ben Tara, 7 Elyes Karamosli, 8 Mohamed Ben Slimane, 9 Khaled Belaid, 10 Walid Ben Abbes, 12 Anouer Taouerghi, 14 Bilel Ben Hassine, 15 Mahdi Gara, 18 Hosni Karamosly (Coach: Veljko Basić).

2010 World Championship: finished 19th among 24 teams

1 Niaz Sallem, 2 Ahmed Kadhi, 4 Marouen Garci, 8 Mohamed Ben Slimen (C), 10 Hamza Nagga, 11 Ismaïl Moalla, 12 Anouer Taouerghi, 13 Haykel Jerbi, 15 Amen Allah Hmissi, 16 Hichem Kaabi, 18 Aymen Karoui, 19 Nabil Miladi (Coach: Fethi Mkaouer).

2011 African Championship: finished 3rd (bronze) among 8 teams

2 Ahmed Kadhi, 4 Marouen Garci, 5 Chokri Jouini, 8 Mohamed Ben Slimane, 10 Hamza Nagga, 11 Ismaïl Moalla, 12 Anouer Taouerghi, 12 Noureddine Hfaiedh, 14 Bilel Ben Hassine, 15 Mehdi Ben Cheikh, 16 Hichem Kaabi, 19 Nabil Miladi (Coach: Fethi Mkaouer).

2012 Summer Olympics: finished 11th among 12 teams

2 Ahmed Kadhi, 3 Marouane M'rabet, 7 Elyes Karamosli, 8 Mohamed Ben Slimane, 10 Hamza Nagga, 11 Ismaïl Moalla, 12 Anouer Taouerghi, 13 Noureddine Hfaiedh (C), 14 Bilel Ben Hassine, 15 Mehdi Ben Cheikh, 16 Hichem Kaabi, 18 Hakim Zouari (Coach: Fethi Mkaouer).

2013 African Championship: finished 2nd (silver) among 6 teams

Saddem Hmisi, Ahmed Kadhi, Marouane M'rabet, Marouen Garci, Samir Sellami, Elyes Karamosli, Hamza Nagga, Ismaïl Moalla, Anouer Taouerghi, Noureddine Hfaiedh, Bilel Ben Hassine, Mohammed Ayech (Coach: Fethi Mkaouer).

2014 World League: finished 27th among 28 teams

1 Saddem Hmissi, 2 Ahmed Kadhi, 3 Marouane M'rabet, 4 Marouen Garci, 5 Samir Sellami (C), 6 Mohamed Ali Ben Othmen Miladi, 7 Elyes Karamosli, 8 Mohamed Ben Slimane, 9 Hakim Zouari, 10 Hamza Nagga, 11 Ismaïl Moalla, 12 Anouer Taouerghi, 13 Noureddine Hfaiedh, 14 Bilel Ben Hassine, 15 Hichem Kaabi, 16 Khaled Ben Slimene, 17 Mohamed Arbi Ben Abdallah, 18 Mohamed Ayech, 19 Bahri Messaoud, 20 Omar Agrebi, 21 Nabil Miladi, 22 Skander Ben Tara (Coach: Fethi Mkaouer).

2014 World Championship: finished 21st among 24 teams

2 Ahmed Kadhi, 4 Marouen Garci 5 Samir Sellami (C), 6 Mohamed Ali Ben Othmen Miladi, 7 Elyes Karamosli, 10 Hamza Nagga, 11 Ismaïl Moalla, 12 Anouer Taouerghi, 15 Hichem Kaabi, 16 Khaled Ben Slimene, 20 Omar Agrebi, 21 Nabil Miladi (Coach: Fethi Mkaouer).

2015 African Championship: finished 2nd (silver) among 9 teams

Tayeb Korbosli, Omar Agrebi, Marouane M'rabet, Marouen Garci, Skander Ben Tara, Mohamed Ali Ben Othmen Miladi, Elyes Karamosli, Nabil Miladi, Ismaïl Moalla, Hichem Kaabi, Khaled Ben Slimene, Amen Allah Hmisi (Coach: Fethi Mkaouer).

2015 World League: finished 30th among 32 teams

1 Tayeb Korbosli, 2 Ahmed Kadhi, 3 Marouane M'rabet, 4 Marouen Garci, 5 Samir Sellami, 6 Mohamed Ali Ben Othmen Miladi, 7 Elyes Karamosli, 8 Mohamed Ben Slimane, 9 Elyes Garfi, 10 Hamza Nagga, 11 Ismaïl Moalla, 12 Anouer Taouerghi, 13 Wassim Ben Tara, 14 Bilel Ben Hassine, 15 Hichem Kaabi, 16 Khaled Ben Slimene, 17 Malek Chekir, 18 Amen Allah Hmissi, 19 Hatem Obba, 20 Omar Agrebi, 21 Nabil Miladi, 22 Skander Ben Tara, 23 Bahri Messaoud, 24 Melek Melliou, 25 Hakim Zouari (Coach: Fethi Mkaouer).

2015 World Cup: finished 12st among 12 teams

1 Tayeb Korbosli, 3 Marouane M'rabet, 4 Marouen Garci (C), 6 Mohamed Ali Ben Othmen Miladi, 7 Elyes Karamosli, 8 Nabil Miladi, 10 Hamza Nagga, 11 Ismaïl Moalla, 13 Haykel Jerbi, 15 Hichem Kaabi, 19 Skander Ben Tara, 20 Omar Agrebi (Coach: Fethi Mkaouer).

2016 World League: finished 33st among 36 teams

1 Tayeb Korbosli, 2 Ahmed Kadhi, 3 Elyes Garfi, 4 Bahri Messaoud, 5 Walid Ben Abbes, 6 Mohamed Ali Ben Othmen Miladi, 7 Elyes Karamosli, 8 Nabil Miladi, 9 Mahdi Ben Cheikh (C), 10 Hamza Nagga, 11 Ismaïl Moalla, 12 Anouer Taouerghi, 13 Haykel Jerbi, 14 Bilel Ben Hassine, 15 Hichem Kaabi, 16 Khaled Ben Slimene, 17 Chokri Jouini, 18 Wassim Ben Tara, 19 Mohamed Ayech, 20 Omar Agrebi, 21 Karim Brini (Coach: Fethi Mkaouer).

2017 World League: finished 30th amoung 36 team

1 Tayeb Korbosli, 2 Ahmed Kadhi, 5 Wassim Ben Tara, 6 Mohamed Ali Ben Othmen Miladi, 7 Elyes Karamosli, 8 Nabil Miladi, 9 Mahdi Ben Cheikh (C), 10 Hamza Nagga, 11 Ismaïl Moalla, 12 Anouer Taouerghi, 13 Elyes Garfi, 14 Bilel Ben Hassine, 15 Hichem Kaabi, 16 Khaled Ben Slimene, 17 Chokri Jouini, 18 Amen Allah Hmissi, 19 Saddem Hmissi, 20 Omar Agrebi, 21 Hakim Zouari (Coach: Antonio Giacobbe).

2017 African Championship: finished 1st (gold) among 14 teams

Tayeb Korbosli, Ahmed Kadhi, Wassim Ben Tara, Mohamed Ali Ben Othmen Miladi, Elyes Karamosli, Nabil Miladi, Mahdi Ben Cheikh, Hamza Nagga, Ismaïl Moalla (MVP), Anouer Taouerghi, Elyes Garfi, Bilel Ben Hassine, Hichem Kaabi, Khaled Ben Slimene, Chokri Jouini, Saddem Hmissi, Omar Agrebi (Coach: Antonio Giacobbe).

2018 World Championship: finished 23st among 24 teams

1 Mohamed Ridene, 2 Ahmed Kadhi, 3 Marouane M'rabet (C), 5 Wassim Ben Tara, 6 Mohamed Ali Ben Othmen Miladi, 7 Elyes Karamosli, 8 Nabil Miladi, 9 Amen Allah Hmissi, 10 Hamza Nagga, 11 Hakim Zouari, 12 Anouer Taouerghi, 16 Khaled Ben Slimene, 18 Ali Bongui, 20 Omar Agrebi (Coach: Antonio Giacobbe).

2019 African Championship: finished 1st (gold) among 10 teams

3 Khaled Ben Slimene, 4 Aymen Redissi, 5 Hosni Karamosly (C), 6 Mohamed Ali Ben Othmen Miladi, 7 Elyes Karamosli, 10 Hamza Nagga (MVP), 11 Ismaïl Moalla, 12 Aymen Karoui, 13 Salim Mbarki, 14 Haykel Jerbi, 16 Mohamed Ayech, 17 Chokri Jouini, 18 Ali Bongui, 20 Saddem Hmissi (Coach: Antonio Giacobbe).

2019 World Cup: finished 12st among 12 teams

3 Khaled Ben Slimene, 4 Aymen Redissi, 5 Hosni Karamosly (C), 6 Mohamed Ali Ben Othmen Miladi, 7 Elyes Karamosli, 10 Hamza Nagga, 11 Ismaïl Moalla, 13 Selim Mbareki, 14 Haykel Jerbi, 16 Mohamed Ayech, 17 Chokri Jouini, 18 Ali Bongui, 20 Saddem Hmissi, 22 Nabil Miladi (Coach: Antonio Giacobbe).

2020 Summer Olympics: finished 11th among 12 teams

2 Ahmed Kadhi, 3 Khaled Ben Slimene, 6 Mohamed Ali Ben Othmen Miladi, 7 Elyes Karamosli, 9 Omar Agrebi, 10 Hamza Nagga, 11 Ismaïl Moalla, 12 Mehdi Ben Cheikh (C), 13 Selim Mbareki, 15 Wassim Ben Tara, 19 Aymen Bouguerra, 20 Saddem Hmissi (Coach: Antonio Giacobbe).

2021 African Championship: finished 1st (gold) among 16 teams

Yassine Kassis, Ahmed Kadhi, Khaled Ben Slimene, Mohamed Ali Ben Othmen Miladi, Elyes Karamosli, Omar Agrebi, Hamza Nagga, Ismaïl Moalla, Mehdi Ben Cheikh (C), Selim Mbareki, Wassim Ben Tara, Mohamed Ayech, Ali Bongui, Saddem Hmissi (Coach: Antonio Giacobbe).

2022 Challenger Cup: finished 6th among 8 teams

2 Ahmed Kadhi, 3 Khaled Ben Slimene (C), 4 Aymen Redissi, 6 Mohamed Ali Ben Othmen Miladi, 7 Elyes Karamosli, 8 Yassine Abdelhedi, 9 Omar Agrebi, 10 Hamza Nagga, 12 Rami Bennour, 13 Selim Mbareki, 16 Mehdi Ben Tahar, 18 Ali Bongui, 19 Aymen Bouguerra, 20 Saddem Hmissi (Coach: Antonio Giacobbe).

2022 World Championship: finished 16th among 24 teams

2 Ahmed Kadhi, 3 Khaled Ben Slimene (C), 6 Mohamed Ali Ben Othmen Miladi, 7 Elyes Karamosli, 8 Yassine Abdelhedi, 9 Omar Agrebi, 10 Hamza Nagga, 12 Rami Bennour, 13 Selim Mbareki, 16 Mehdi Ben Tahar, 18 Ali Bongui, 19 Aymen Bouguerra, 20 Saddem Hmissi, 21 Taieb Korbosli (Coach: Antonio Giacobbe).

2023 African Championship: finished 5th among 16 teams

2 Ahmed Kadhi, 3 Khaled Ben Slimene (C), 4 Taieb Korbosli, 6 Mohamed Ali Ben Othmen Miladi, 7 Elyes Karamosli, 8 Oussama Ben Romdhane, 9 Omar Agrebi, 10 Hamza Nagga, 12 Marouane M'rabet, 13 Selim Mbareki, 15 Mohamed Ben Youssef Lasgher, 18 Ali Bongui, 19 Aymen Bouguerra, 20 Saddem Hmissi (Coach: Antonio Giacobbe).

2023 Challenger Cup: finished 8th among 8 teams

1 Achref Chargui, 2 Ahmed Kadhi, 3 Khaled Ben Slimene (C), 4 Taieb Korbosli, 6 Mohamed Ali Ben Othmen Miladi, 7 Elyes Karamosli, 8 Oussama Ben Romdhane, 9 Omar Agrebi, 10 Hamza Nagga, 12 Marouane M'rabet, 13 Selim Mbareki, 18 Ali Bongui, 19 Aymen Bouguerra, 20 Saddem Hmissi (Coach: Antonio Giacobbe).

2025 World Championship: finished 12th among 32 teams

1 Ahmed Salem Boussabah, 2 Ahmed Kadhi, 3 Khaled Ben Slimene (C), 7 Elyes Karamosli, 8 Achref Bouaziz, 9 Hamza Hfaiedh, 11 Walid Mokhtar Baccour, 12 Mohamed Ridene, 13 Selim Mbareki, 14 Oussama Ben Romdhane, 15 Elyes Bouachir, 17 Mahdi Ben Tahar, 18 Ali Bongui, 19 Taieb Korbosli (Coach: Camillo Placi).

2026 African Championship: finished 1st (gold) among 13 teams

2 Ahmed Kadhi, 3 Khaled Ben Slimene (C), 4 Mohamed Ben Youssef Lasgher, 5 Mahdi Bentaher, 7 Elyes Karamosli, 9 Hamza Hfaiedh, 11 Wajdi Baroudi, 12 Mohamed Ridene, 13 Selim Mbareki, 14 Oussama Ben Romdhane (MVP), 18 Ali Bongui, 19 Tayeb Korbosli, 20 Hedi Khazri (Coach: Camillo Placi).

== Honours ==
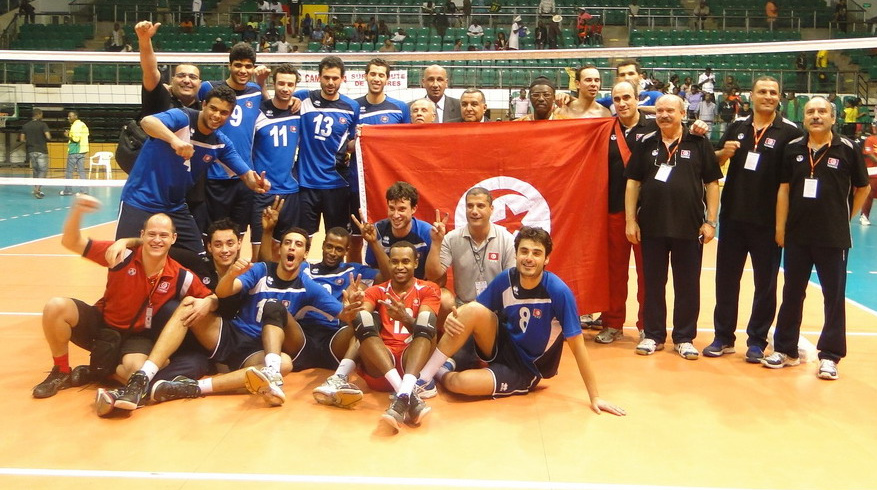
The team's players celebrate after qualifying for the 2012 Summer Olympics.

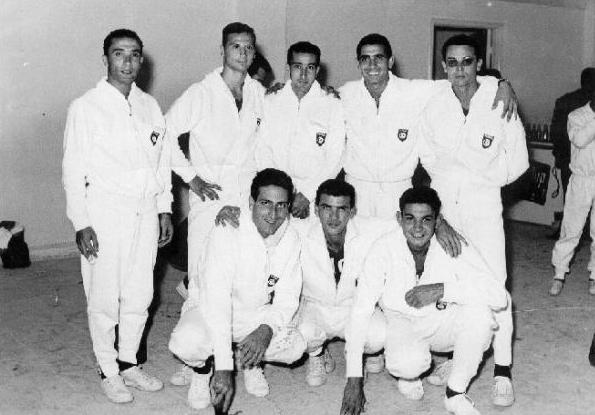
The 1957 Arab Games gold medalist roster.

=== Intercontinental competitions ===
- Afro-Arab Volleyball Friendship Cup

Champions (1): 1981

- Mediterranean Games

Runners-up (2): 2001, 2013

=== Continental competitions ===
- African Nations Championship

Champions (12): 1967, 1971, 1979, 1987, 1995, 1997, 1999, 2003, 2017, 2019, 2021, 2026
Runners-up (7): 1976, 1983, 1993, 2005, 2007, 2013, 2015
Third place (2): 1991, 2011

- African Games

Champions (1): 1978
Runner-up (3): 1965, 1973, 2007
Third place (1): 1991

=== Regional competitions ===
- Arab Championship

Champions (8): 1980, 1984, 1988, 1996, 2000, 2002, 2006, 2012
Runner-up (2): 1998, 2008
Third place (1): 1994

- Arab Games

Champions (3): 1957, 1985, 1999
Third place (1): 2004

- Arab Challenge Cup

Champions (1): 2025

- Maghreb Championship

Champions (7): 1967, 1968, 1969, 1970, 1971, 1972, 1973

=== Other competitions ===
- Cup of the President of Kazakhstan

Champions: 2012

- Rashed International Tournament

Champions: 2012

- Torneo Internazionale Del Due Mari

Runner-up: 2023

== See also ==
- Tunisian Volleyball Federation
- Tunisia men's national under-23 volleyball team
- Tunisia men's national under-21 volleyball team
- Tunisia men's national under-19 volleyball team
- Tunisia women's national volleyball team
- Tunisia women's national under-23 volleyball team
- Tunisia women's national under-21 volleyball team
- Tunisia women's national under-18 volleyball team
