= 2019 Men's African Volleyball Championship =

2019 Men's African Championship

Tournament details
- Host country: Tunisia
- City: Tunis
- Dates: 21–28 July
- Teams: 10 (from 1 confederation)
- Venue: 1 (in 1 host city)

Final positions
- Champions: Tunisia (10th title)
- Runners-up: Cameroon
- Third place: Algeria
- Fourth place: Egypt

Tournament awards
- MVP: (Tunisia) Hamza Nagga

The 2019 Men's African Volleyball Championship was the 22nd edition of the Men's African Volleyball Championship, a biennial international volleyball tournament organised by the African Volleyball Confederation (CAVB). The tournament was held in Tunis, Tunisia from 21 to 28 July 2019.

== Qualification ==
10 teams have registered to participate in the 2019 African Championship.

Means of qualification	Qualifier
Host Country	Tunisia
FIVB World Ranking	Egypt
FIVB World Ranking	Cameroon
FIVB World Ranking	Algeria
Zone 1	Morocco
Zone 4	Chad
Zone 4	DR Congo
Zone 4	Congo
Zone 5	Burundi
Zone 6	Botswana

== Pools composition ==
The draw was held in Tunis, Tunisia on 20 July 2019.

Pool A	Pool B
Tunisia (Hosts)	Cameroon
Algeria	Egypt
DR Congo	Congo
Chad	Morocco
Botswana	Burundi

== Venue ==
Tunis	Tunis (Tunisia)
El Menzah Sports Palace	Tunis (Tunisia)
Capacity: 6,000	Tunis (Tunisia)

== Pool standing procedure ==
1. Number of matches won
2. Match points
3. Sets ratio
4. Points ratio
5. Result of the last match between the tied teams

Match won 3–0 or 3–1: 3 match points for the winner, 0 match points for the loser
Match won 3–2: 2 match points for the winner, 1 match point for the loser.

== Preliminary round ==
- All times are West Africa Time (UTC+01:00).

=== Pool A ===
Pos	Team	Pld	W	L	Pts	SW	SL	SR	SPW	SPL	SPR	Qualification
1	Tunisia	4	4	0	12	12	0	MAX	301	185	1.627	Semifinals
2	Algeria	4	3	1	9	9	3	3.000	284	214	1.327	Semifinals
3	DR Congo	4	2	2	6	6	7	0.857	270	285	0.947	5th–8th semifinals
4	Chad	4	1	3	2	4	11	0.364	278	342	0.813	5th–8th semifinals
5	Botswana	4	0	4	1	2	12	0.167	227	334	0.680	9th place match

Date	Time		Score		Set 1	Set 2	Set 3	Set 4	Set 5	Total	Report
21 Jul	13:00	DR Congo	3–0	Botswana	25–11	25–18	25–14			75–43	Result
21 Jul	20:00	Tunisia	3–0	Chad	25–15	25–11	25–11			75–37	Result
22 Jul	17:30	Algeria	3–0	DR Congo	25–16	25–19	25–19			75–54	P2
22 Jul	20:00	Botswana	0–3	Tunisia	14–25	24–26	6–25			44–76	P2
23 Jul	13:00	Chad	3–2	Botswana	22–25	25–20	21–25	25–18	15–8	108–96	P2
23 Jul	20:15	Tunisia	3–0	Algeria	25–20	25–20	25–19			75–59	P2
24 Jul	15:00	Algeria	3–0	Chad	25–14	25–14	25–13			75–41	P2
24 Jul	20:00	DR Congo	0–3	Tunisia	17–25	14–25	14–25			45–75	P2
25 Jul	15:00	Chad	1–3	DR Congo	21–25	25–19	21–25	25–27		92–96	P2
25 Jul	18:10	Botswana	0–3	Algeria	20–25	13–25	11–25			44–75	P2

=== Pool B ===
Pos	Team	Pld	W	L	Pts	SW	SL	SR	SPW	SPL	SPR	Qualification
1	Cameroon	4	4	0	12	12	0	MAX	300	230	1.304	Semifinals
2	Egypt	4	3	1	9	9	4	2.250	305	281	1.085	Semifinals
3	Congo	4	2	2	6	6	8	0.750	332	339	0.979	5th–8th semifinals
4	Morocco	4	1	3	3	5	10	0.500	356	344	1.035	5th–8th semifinals
5	Burundi	4	0	4	0	2	12	0.167	246	345	0.713	9th place match

Date	Time		Score		Set 1	Set 2	Set 3	Set 4	Set 5	Total	Report
21 Jul	15:00	Cameroon	3–0	Congo	25–21	25–23	25–20			75–64	Result
21 Jul	17:00	Egypt	3–1	Morocco	25–20	25–23	23–25	30–28		103–96	Result
22 Jul	13:00	Morocco	1–3	Congo	25–23	25–27	20–25	28–30		98–105	P2
22 Jul	15:45	Egypt	3–0	Burundi	25–16	25–13	25–13			75–42	P2
23 Jul	16:00	Burundi	1–3	Morocco	27–25	11–25	11–25	12–25		61–100	P2
23 Jul	18:20	Cameroon	3–0	Egypt	25–18	25–13	25–19			75–50	P2
24 Jul	13:00	Burundi	0–3	Cameroon	13–25	21–25	20–25			54–75	P2
24 Jul	17:00	Egypt	3–0	Congo	25–21	27–25	25–22			77–68	P2
25 Jul	13:00	Congo	3–1	Burundi	20–25	25–22	25–20	25–22		95–89	P2
25 Jul	20:00	Cameroon	3–0	Morocco	25–16	25–23	25–23			75–62	P2

== Final round ==
- All times are West Africa Time (UTC+01:00).

=== 9th–10th places ===
==== 9th place match ====
Date	Time		Score		Set 1	Set 2	Set 3	Set 4	Set 5	Total	Report
26 Jul	10:00	Botswana	0–3	Burundi	16–25	18–25	18–25			52–75	P2

=== 5th–8th places ===
5th–8th semifinals
26 July
Chad	0
Congo	3
26 July
DR Congo	1
Morocco	3

5th place match
28 July
Congo	2
Morocco	3
7th place match
28 July
Chad	3
DR Congo	0

==== 5th–8th semifinals ====
Date	Time		Score		Set 1	Set 2	Set 3	Set 4	Set 5	Total	Report
26 Jul	13:00	Chad	0–3	Congo	22–25	24–26	19–25			65–76	P2
26 Jul	15:00	DR Congo	1–3	Morocco	25–21	22–25	18–25	22–25		87–96	P2

==== 7th place match ====
Date	Time		Score		Set 1	Set 2	Set 3	Set 4	Set 5	Total	Report
28 Jul	13:00	Chad	3–0	DR Congo	25–0	25–0	25–0			75–0	Forfeit

==== 5th place match ====
Date	Time		Score		Set 1	Set 2	Set 3	Set 4	Set 5	Total	Report
28 Jul	15:00	Congo	2–3	Morocco	23–25	25–22	25–20	18–25	9–15	100–107	P2

=== Final four ===
Semifinals
26 July
Tunisia	3
Egypt	1
26 July
Algeria	0
Cameroon	3

Final
28 July
Tunisia	3
Cameroon	2
3rd place match
28 July
Egypt	1
Algeria	3

==== Semifinals ====
Date	Time		Score		Set 1	Set 2	Set 3	Set 4	Set 5	Total	Report
26 Jul	17:20	Algeria	0–3	Cameroon	22–25	22–25	21–25			65–75	P2
26 Jul	19:20	Tunisia	3–1	Egypt	18–25	25–20	25–18	25–17		93–80	P2

==== 3rd place match ====
Date	Time		Score		Set 1	Set 2	Set 3	Set 4	Set 5	Total	Report
28 Jul	17:30	Egypt	1–3	Algeria	25–23	22–25	16–25	20–25		83–98	P2

==== Final ====
Date	Time		Score		Set 1	Set 2	Set 3	Set 4	Set 5	Total	Report
28 Jul	20:00	Tunisia	3–2	Cameroon	23–25	25–20	26–24	21–25	15–13	110–107	P2

== Final standing ==
Rank	Team
1st place, gold medalist(s)	Tunisia
2nd place, silver medalist(s)	Cameroon
3rd place, bronze medalist(s)	Algeria
4	Egypt
5	Morocco
6	Congo
7	Chad
8	DR Congo
9	Burundi
10	Botswana

Qualified for the 2020 Challenger Cup

2019 Men's African champions

Tunisia
10th title

14–man roster
Khaled Ben Slimene, Aymen Redissi, Hosni Karamosly (c), Mohamed Ali Ben Othmen Miladi, Elyes Karamosli, Hamza Nagga, Ismaïl Moalla, Aymen Karoui, Salim Mbarki, Haykel Jerbi, Mohamed Ayech, Chokri Jouini, Ali Bongui, Saddem Hmissi
Head coach
(Italy) Antonio Giacobbe

== Awards ==
- Most valuable player
  (Tunisia) Hamza Nagga
- Best spiker
  (Cameroon) Yvan Kody
- Best blocker
  (Tunisia) Salim Mbarki
- Best server
  (Cameroon) Didier Sali Hilé
- Best setter
  (Cameroon) Ahmed Awal Mbutngam
- Best receiver
  (Tunisia) Ismaïl Moalla
- Best libero
  (Algeria) Ilyes Achour

== See also ==
- 2019 Women's African Volleyball Championship
