= 2013 African Volleyball Championship U21 =

Tournament details
- Host country: Tunisia
- Dates: 2–9 March
- Teams: 10
- Venue: 1 (in 1 host city)

Final positions
- Champions: Tunisia (9th title)

The 2013 African Volleyball Championship U21 was held in Sidi Bou Said, Tunisia from 2 to 9 March 2013. The semi-finalists qualified for the 2013 World Junior Championship.

== Teams ==
The teams are as follows.

Pool A	Pool B
Tunisia (host); Algeria; Congo; Rwanda; Sierra Leone	Libya; Egypt; DR Congo; Morocco; South Africa

== Preliminary round ==
=== Pool A ===
Pos	Team	Pld	W	L	Pts	SW	SL	SR	SPW	SPL	SPR	Qualification
1	Tunisia	4	4	0	12	12	0	MAX	301	183	1.645	Semifinals
2	Rwanda	4	3	1	9	9	5	1.800	308	266	1.158	Semifinals
3	Algeria	4	2	2	6	7	6	1.167	295	265	1.113	
4	Congo	4	1	3	3	4	9	0.444	244	299	0.816	
5	Sierra Leone	4	0	4	0	0	12	0.000	165	300	0.550	

Date	Time		Score		Set 1	Set 2	Set 3	Set 4	Set 5	Total	Report
02 Mar	12:00	Rwanda	3–1	Congo	25–16	25–16	22–25	25-15		97–57	
02 Mar	18:00	Tunisia	3–0	Sierra Leone	25–11	25–05	25–14			75–30	
03 Mar	14:00	Sierra Leone	0–3	Algeria	14–25	15–25	14–25			43–75	
03 Mar	18:00	Rwanda	0–3	Tunisia	25–13	25–15	25–17			75–45	
04 Mar	14:00	Sierra Leone	0–3	Congo	22–25	10–25	16–25			48–75	
04 Mar	18:00	Tunisia	3–0	Algeria	25–19	25–23	26–24			76–66	
05 Mar	12:00	Sierra Leone	0–3	Rwanda	19–25	10–25	15–25			44–75	
05 Mar	16:00	Algeria	3–0	Congo	25–19	25–19	29–27			79–65	
06 Mar	14:00	Algeria	1–3	Rwanda	16–25	13–25	25–16	21-25		75–66	
06 Mar	18:00	Tunisia	3–0	Congo	25–17	25–16	25–09			75–42	

=== Pool B ===
Pos	Team	Pld	W	L	Pts	SW	SL	SR	SPW	SPL	SPR	Qualification
1	Egypt	4	4	0	12	12	0	MAX	300	193	1.554	Semifinals
2	Morocco	4	3	1	9	9	4	2.250	300	269	1.115	Semifinals
3	Libya	4	2	2	5	7	8	0.875	318	329	0.967	
4	DR Congo	4	1	3	4	5	9	0.556	286	320	0.894	
5	South Africa	4	0	4	0	0	12	0.000	207	300	0.690	

Date	Time		Score		Set 1	Set 2	Set 3	Set 4	Set 5	Total	Report
02 Mar	14:00	Morocco	3–0	South Africa	25–18	25–15	25–23			75–56	
02 Mar	16:00	Egypt	3–0	DR Congo	25–17	25–14	25–13			75–44	
03 Mar	12:00	South Africa	0–3	Egypt	11–25	14–25	14–25			39–75	
03 Mar	16:00	DR Congo	2–3	Libya	28–26	25–20	18–25	21-25	13-15	105–71	
04 Mar	12:00	South Africa	0–3	DR Congo	23–25	21–25	19–25			63–75	
04 Mar	16:00	Morocco	3–1	Libya	20–25	25–22	25–19	25-16		95–66	
05 Mar	14:00	South Africa	0–3	Libya	17–25	15–25	16–25			48–75	
05 Mar	18:00	Egypt	3–0	Morocco	25–18	25–20	25–15			75–53	
06 Mar	12:00	DR Congo	0–3	Morocco	19–25	16–25	23–25			58–75	
06 Mar	16:00	Egypt	3–0	Libya	25–18	25–20	25–18			75–56	

== Classification round ==
=== 9th place ===
Date	Time		Score		Set 1	Set 2	Set 3	Set 4	Set 5	Total	Report
08 Mar	10:00	Sierra Leone	0–3	South Africa	16–25	15–25	21–25			52–75	

=== 5–8th place bracket ===
5th–8th places
March 8 – Sidi Bou Said
Congo	1
Libya	3
March 8 – Sidi Bou Said
Algeria	3
DR Congo	1

5th place
March 9 – Sidi Bou Said
Libya	0
Algeria	3
7th place
March 9 – Sidi Bou Said
Congo	0
DR Congo	3

==== Classification 5–8 places ====
Date	Time		Score		Set 1	Set 2	Set 3	Set 4	Set 5	Total	Report
08 Mar	12:00	Congo	1–3	Libya	26–24	20–25	17–25	16-25		79–74	
08 Mar	14:00	Algeria	3–1	DR Congo	20–25	25–20	25–17	25-23		95–62	

==== Seventh-place match ====
Date	Time		Score		Set 1	Set 2	Set 3	Set 4	Set 5	Total	Report
09 Mar	10:00	Libya	0–3	Algeria	24–26	21–25	18–25			63–76	

==== Fifth-place match ====
Date	Time		Score		Set 1	Set 2	Set 3	Set 4	Set 5	Total	Report
09 Mar	12:00	DR Congo	3–0	Congo	25–19	25–20	25–21			75–60	

== Final round ==
Semifinals
March 8
Tunisia	3
Morocco	0
March 8
Rwanda	0
Egypt	3

Final
March 9
Tunisia	3
Egypt	1
3rd place
March 9
Morocco	0
Rwanda	3

=== Semifinals ===
Date	Time		Score		Set 1	Set 2	Set 3	Set 4	Set 5	Total	Report
08 Mar	16:30	Egypt	3–0	Rwanda	25–18	25–19	25–21			75–58	
08 Mar	18:30	Tunisia	3–0	Morocco	25–17	25–22	25–13			75–52	

=== Bronze-medal match ===
Date	Time		Score		Set 1	Set 2	Set 3	Set 4	Set 5	Total	Report
09 Mar	15:00	Morocco	0–3	Rwanda	25–27	25–27	21–25			71–79	

=== Final ===
Date	Time		Score		Set 1	Set 2	Set 3	Set 4	Set 5	Total	Report
09 Mar	17:00	Tunisia	3–1	Egypt	25–17	22–25	25–19	25-21		97–61	

== Final standing ==
Rank	Team
Gold medal	Tunisia
Silver medal	Egypt
Bronze medal	Rwanda
4	Morocco
5	Algeria
6	Libya
7	DR Congo
8	Congo
9	South Africa
10	Sierra Leone

Qualified for the 2013 Junior World Championship

2013 African Junior champions

Tunisia
Ninth title

Team roster
Taïeb Korbosli (L), Khaled Ben Slimene, Oussema Mrika, Montassar Ben Braham, Malek Chekir, Elyes Garfi, Adem Oueslati, Mohamed Amine Htira, Wassim Ben Tara, Mohamed Brahem, Sahbi Belkahla, Karim Mselmani

Head coach: Fethi Mkaouar

== Awards ==
- MVP: (Tunisia) Malek Chekir
- Best spiker: (Rwanda) Aimable Mutuyimana
- Best blocker: (Egypt) Mohamed Adel
- Best server: (Tunisia) Mohamed Brahim
- Best libero: (Tunisia) Tayeb Korbosli
- Best setter: (Morocco) Amine Zayani
- Best receiver: (Egypt) Reda Abdelmagid
