= 2012 Men's Arab Volleyball Championship =

2012 men's volleyball championship

Tournament details
- Host country: Bahrain
- Dates: November 6–13
- Teams: 8
- Venue: (in 1 host city)

Final positions
- Champions: Tunisia (7th title)

The 2012 Men's Arab Volleyball Championship was the 18th edition of the Arab Volleyball Championship. It was held in Bahrain from 6 November to 13 November 2012.

== Teams ==
- Bahrain
- Iraq
- Jordan
- Kuwait
- Saudi Arabia
- Libya
- Tunisia
- United Arab Emirates

== Group stage ==
The draw was held on 19 October 2012.

Pool A	Pool B
Tunisia; Jordan; Libya; Iraq	Bahrain (Host & Defending Champion); Kuwait; Saudi Arabia; United Arab Emirates

=== Group A ===
Pos	Team	Pld	W	L	Pts	SW	SL	SR	SPW	SPL	SPR	Qualification
1	Tunisia	3	3	0	9	9	0	MAX	229	158	1.449	Semifinals
2	Libya	3	2	1	6	6	5	1.200	228	235	0.970	Semifinals
3	Iraq	3	1	2	3	4	6	0.667	209	226	0.925	5–8th place
4	Jordan	3	0	3	0	1	9	0.111	206	253	0.814	5–8th place

Date	Time		Score		Set 1	Set 2	Set 3	Set 4	Set 5	Total	Report
7 Nov	16:30	Tunisia	3–0	Jordan	25-22	29-27	25-21			79–0	
7 Nov	18:30	Iraq	1–3	Libya	25-13	19-25	24-26	18-25		86–0	
9 Nov	16:30	Tunisia	3–0	Libya	25-12	25-15	25-14			75–0	
9 Nov	18:30	Jordan	0–3	Iraq	18-25	20-25	24-26			62–0	
10 Nov	14:30	Libya	3–1	Jordan	23-25	25-18	25-18	25-13		98–0	
10 Nov	16:30	Tunisia	3–0	Iraq	25-11	25-22	25-14			75–0	

=== Group B ===
Pos	Team	Pld	W	L	Pts	SW	SL	SR	SPW	SPL	SPR	Qualification
1	Bahrain	3	3	0	8	9	2	4.500	259	199	1.302	Semifinals
2	Saudi Arabia	3	2	1	6	6	4	1.500	236	223	1.058	Semifinals
3	Kuwait	3	1	2	3	6	8	0.750	284	308	0.922	5–8th place
4	United Arab Emirates	3	0	3	1	2	9	0.222	207	256	0.809	5–8th place

Date	Time		Score		Set 1	Set 2	Set 3	Set 4	Set 5	Total	Report
6 Nov	16:30	Saudi Arabia	3–1	Kuwait	25-22	20-25	25-20	25-18		95–0	
6 Nov	19:15	Bahrain	3–0	United Arab Emirates	25-12	25-16	25-12			75–0	
8 Nov	16:30	United Arab Emirates	0–3	Saudi Arabia	22-25	23-25	18-25			63–0	
8 Nov	18:30	Bahrain	3–2	Kuwait	25-16	21-25	25-17	23-25	15-10	109–0	
10 Nov	12:30	Kuwait	3–2	United Arab Emirates	25-20	22-25	25-23	19-25	15-11	106–0	
10 Nov	18:30	Bahrain	3–0	Saudi Arabia	25-23	25-22	25-21			75–0	

== Final round ==
=== Classification 5–8 places ===
==== Seventh place match ====
Date	Time		Score		Set 1	Set 2	Set 3	Set 4	Set 5	Total	Report
12 Nov	12:30	Jordan	3–1	United Arab Emirates	23-25	25-18	25-21	25-22		98–0	

==== Fifth place match ====
Date	Time		Score		Set 1	Set 2	Set 3	Set 4	Set 5	Total	Report
12 Nov	14:30	Kuwait	2–3	Iraq	19-25	25-23	20-25	25-19	13-15	102–0	

=== Championship bracket ===
Semifinals
November 12 – Riffa
Tunisia	3
Saudi Arabia	0
November 12 – Riffa
Bahrain	3
Libya	0

Final
November 13 – Riffa
Bahrain	2
Tunisia	3
Third place
November 13 – Riffa
Saudi Arabia	1
Libya	3

==== Semifinals ====
Date	Time		Score		Set 1	Set 2	Set 3	Set 4	Set 5	Total	Report
12 Nov	16:30	Tunisia	3–0	Saudi Arabia	25-12	25-20	25-19			75–0	
12 Nov	18:30	Bahrain	3–0	Libya	25-14	25-20	25-19			75–0	

==== Bronze medal match ====
Date	Time		Score		Set 1	Set 2	Set 3	Set 4	Set 5	Total	Report
13 Nov	16:30	Saudi Arabia	1–3	Libya	23-25	25-22	23-25	15-25		86–0	

=== Final ===
Date	Time		Score		Set 1	Set 2	Set 3	Set 4	Set 5	Total	Report
13 Nov	18:30	Bahrain	2–3	Tunisia	23-25	21-25	26-24	25-23	13-15	108–0	

== Final standing ==
Rank	Team
1st place, gold medalist(s)	Tunisia
2nd place, silver medalist(s)	Bahrain
3rd place, bronze medalist(s)	Libya
4	Saudi Arabia
5	Iraq
6	Kuwait
7	Jordan
8	United Arab Emirates

2012 Men's Arab champions

Tunisia
7th title

12-man Roster
Saddem Hmissi, Anouar Taouerghi, Bilel Ben Hassine, Nabil Miladi, Marouane Garci, Marouane M'rabet, Mehdi Ben Cheikh, Ahmed Kadhi, Elyes Karamosly, Hamza Nagga, Mohamed Ali Ben Othmen Miladi, Ismail Moalla
Head coach
Fethi Mkaouer

== Awards ==
- Best scorer: (Bahrain) Fadhel Abbas
- Best spiker: (Tunisia) Elyes Karamosly
- Best blocker: (Tunisia) Marouane Garci
- Best server: (Bahrain) Hassan Dhahi
- Best setter: (Tunisia) Mehdi Ben Cheikh
- Best receiver: (Libya) Fouad Al Maaroug
- Best libero: (Bahrain) Aymen Harouna
