= 2006 Men's Arab Volleyball Championship =

Tournament details
- Host country: Bahrain
- Dates: November 16–23
- Teams: 10
- Venue: (in 1 host city)

Final positions
- Champions: Tunisia (7th title)

The 2006 Men's Arab Volleyball Championship was held in Manama, Bahrain, from November 16 to November 23, 2006.

== Teams ==
- Algeria
- Bahrain
- Iraq
- Kuwait
- Lebanon
- Oman
- Qatar
- Saudi Arabia
- Sudan
- Tunisia (B Team)

== Pools composition ==
Pool A	Pool B
Bahrain (Host); Tunisia; Qatar; Kuwait; Lebanon	Saudi Arabia; Algeria; Iraq; Sudan; Oman

=== Pool A ===
Pos	Team	Pld	W	L	Pts	SW	SL	SR	SPW	SPL	SPR	Qualification
1	Bahrain	4	4	0	8	12	3	4.000	358	319	1.122	Semifinals
2	Tunisia	4	3	1	7	10	6	1.667	364	326	1.117	Semifinals
3	Qatar	4	2	2	6	9	8	1.125	373	360	1.036	
4	Lebanon	4	1	3	5	4	11	0.364	278	342	0.813	
5	Kuwait	4	0	4	4	5	12	0.417	348	374	0.930	

Date	Time		Score		Set 1	Set 2	Set 3	Set 4	Set 5	Total	Report
16 Nov	14:30	Bahrain	3–1	Kuwait	25–22	13–25	25–17	27–25		90–89	
16 Nov	16:30	Lebanon	0–3	Qatar	19–25	19–25	12–25			50–75	
17 Nov	14:00	Qatar	2–3	Tunisia	20–25	25–22	25–17	25–27	11–15	106–106	
17 Nov	16:00	Bahrain	3–0	Lebanon	25–19	25–20	26–24			76–63	
18 Nov	08:00	Kuwait	0–3	Tunisia	17–25	23–25	19–25			59–75	
18 Nov	16:00	Bahrain	3–1	Qatar	22–25	25–16	25–18	25–23		97–82	
20 Nov	08:00	Lebanon	3–2	Kuwait	21–25	25–16	25–21	13–25	15–6	99–93	
20 Nov	16:00	Bahrain	3–1	Tunisia	20–25	25–22	25–19	25–19		95–85	
21 Nov	12:00	Qatar	3–2	Kuwait	22–25	25–23	23–25	25–23	15–11	110–107	
21 Nov	16:00	Tunisia	3–1	Lebanon	23–25	25–9	25–21	25–11		98–66	

=== Pool B ===
Pos	Team	Pld	W	L	Pts	SW	SL	SR	SPW	SPL	SPR	Qualification
1	Algeria	4	4	0	8	12	2	6.000	331	273	1.212	Semifinals
2	Saudi Arabia	4	3	1	7	11	4	2.750	362	307	1.179	Semifinals
3	Oman	4	2	2	6	6	7	0.857	293	301	0.973	
4	Sudan	4	1	3	5	5	9	0.556	305	332	0.919	
5	Iraq	4	0	4	4	0	12	0.000	222	300	0.740	

Date	Time		Score		Set 1	Set 2	Set 3	Set 4	Set 5	Total	Report
16 Nov	06:30	Algeria	3–0	Oman	25–19	25–22	25–16			75–57	
16 Nov	08:30	Iraq	0–3	Sudan	17–25	21–25	19–25			57–75	
17 Nov	06:30	Iraq	0–3	Algeria	18–25	15–25	22–25			55–75	
17 Nov	12:00	Saudi Arabia	3–0	Oman	25–17	28–26	25–23			78–66	
18 Nov	12:00	Sudan	1–3	Saudi Arabia	21–25	32–30	16–25	19–25		88–105	
18 Nov	14:00	Oman	3–0	Iraq	25–23	25–20	25–20			75–63	
20 Nov	12:00	Saudi Arabia	3–0	Iraq	25–15	25–15	25–17			75–47	
20 Nov	14:00	Algeria	3–0	Sudan	25–23	25–16	25–18			75–57	
21 Nov	08:00	Oman	3–1	Sudan	25–22	20–25	25–19	25–19		95–85	
21 Nov	16:00	Algeria	3–2	Saudi Arabia	25–19	19–25	26–24	21–25	15–11	106–104	

== Final round ==
=== Classification 5–10 places ===
==== Ninth place match ====
Date	Time		Score		Set 1	Set 2	Set 3	Set 4	Set 5	Total	Report
22 Nov	07:00	Iraq	0–3	Kuwait	20–25	18–25	23–25			61–75	

==== Seventh place match ====
Date	Time		Score		Set 1	Set 2	Set 3	Set 4	Set 5	Total	Report
22 Nov	09:00	Sudan	2–3	Lebanon	17–25	25–20	20–25	25–17	13–15	100–102	

==== Fifth place match ====
Date	Time		Score		Set 1	Set 2	Set 3	Set 4	Set 5	Total	Report
22 Nov	12:00	Oman	1–3	Qatar	16–25	25–14	20–25	22–25		83–89	

=== Championship bracket ===
Semifinals
November 22 – Manama
Tunisia	3
Algeria	1
November 22 – Manama
Saudi Arabia	3
Bahrain	1

Final
November 23 – Manama
Saudi Arabia	1
Tunisia	3
Third place
November 23 – Manama
Bahrain	2
Algeria	3

==== Semifinals ====
Date	Time		Score		Set 1	Set 2	Set 3	Set 4	Set 5	Total	Report
22 Nov	14:00	Tunisia	3–1	Algeria	25–21	26–24	15–25	25–20		91–90	
22 Nov	16:00	Saudi Arabia	3–1	Bahrain	25–20	24–26	30–28	34–32		113–106	

==== Bronze medal match ====
Date	Time		Score		Set 1	Set 2	Set 3	Set 4	Set 5	Total	Report
23 Nov		Bahrain	2–3	Algeria	19–25	25–18	19–25	25–20	14–16	102–104	

==== Final ====
Date	Time		Score		Set 1	Set 2	Set 3	Set 4	Set 5	Total	Report
23 Nov	15:30	Saudi Arabia	1–3	Tunisia	35–33	22–25	18–25	20–25		95–108	

== Final standing ==
Rank	Team
1st place, gold medalist(s)	Tunisia
2nd place, silver medalist(s)	Saudi Arabia
3rd place, bronze medalist(s)	Algeria
4	Bahrain
5	Qatar
6	Oman
7	Lebanon
8	Sudan
9	Kuwait
10	Iraq

2006 Arab champions

Tunisia
6th title

Team Roster

Bilel Ben Hassine, Anouer Taouerghi, Mohamed Ben Slimane, Marouane M'rabet, Salem Mejri, Tarek Sammari, Marouen Fehri, Seifeddine Hmem, Marouen Garci, Mahdi Gara ...

Head Coach: Hichem Ben Romdhane

== Awards ==
- MVP: (Tunisia) Tarek Sammari
- Best spiker: (Bahrain) Sadek Ibrahim
- Best blocker: (Tunisia) Seifeddine Hmem
- Best server: (Algeria) Hicham Guemmadi
- Best setter: (Saudi Arabia) Khalil Al Bahrani
- Best receiver: (Saudi Arabia) Ahmed Al Bakhet
- Best libero: (Bahrain) Aymen Harouna
