= 2008 African Volleyball Championship U21 =

Tournament details
- Host country: Tunisia
- Dates: August 23–30
- Teams: 8
- Venue: 1 (in 1 host city)

Final positions
- Champions: Tunisia (7th title)

Tournament awards
- MVP: (Tunisia) Elyes Karamosly

The 2008 African Volleyball Championship U21 was the 13th edition of the African Volleyball Championship U21. It was held in Sidi Bou Said, Tunisia from 23 August to 30 August 2010. The finalists qualified for the 2009 Junior World Championship.

== Teams ==
- Algeria
- Benin
- Botswana
- Cameroon
- Egypt
- Morocco
- South Africa
- Tunisia

== Group stage ==
The draw was held on 21 August.

=== Group A ===
Pos	Team	Pld	W	L	Pts	SW	SL	SR	SPW	SPL	SPR	Qualification
1	Tunisia	3	3	0	6	9	0	MAX	225	131	1.718	Semifinals
2	Algeria	3	2	1	5	6	3	2.000	187	179	1.045	Semifinals
3	South Africa	3	1	2	4	3	7	0.429	214	243	0.881	
4	Cameroon	3	0	3	3	1	9	0.111	175	249	0.703	

Date	Time		Score		Set 1	Set 2	Set 3	Set 4	Set 5	Total	Report
23 Aug	1:09	Tunisia	3–0	South Africa	25–19	25–22	25–19			75–60	
24 Aug	1:06	Algeria	3–0	Cameroon	25–16	25–16	25–17			75–49	
25 Aug	1:06	South Africa	0–3	Algeria	15–25	20–25	20–25			55–75	
25 Aug	1:00	Cameroon	0–3	Tunisia	9–25	17–25	8–25			34–75	
26 Aug	1:44	South Africa	3–1	Cameroon	29–27	20–25	25–23	25–18		99–93	
26 Aug	1:00	Algeria	0–3	Tunisia	15–25	9–25	13–25			37–75	

=== Group B ===
Pos	Team	Pld	W	L	Pts	SW	SL	SR	SPW	SPL	SPR	Qualification
1	Egypt	3	3	0	6	9	1	9.000	240	161	1.491	Semifinals
2	Morocco	3	2	1	5	7	4	1.750	224	193	1.161	Semifinals
3	Benin	3	1	2	4	3	7	0.429	194	233	0.833	
4	Botswana	3	0	3	3	1	9	0.111	179	250	0.716	

Date	Time		Score		Set 1	Set 2	Set 3	Set 4	Set 5	Total	Report
24 Aug	0:59	Egypt	3–0	Botswana	25–13	25–16	25–11			75–40	
24 Aug	1:04	Morocco	3–0	Benin	25–16	25–14	25–17			75–47	
25 Aug	1:46	Botswana	1–3	Benin	21–25	25–23	15–25	22-25		83–73	
25 Aug	1:31	Morocco	1–3	Egypt	19–25	14–25	25–15	14–25		72–90	
26 Aug	1:00	Morocco	3–0	Botswana	25–11	25–20	27–25			77–56	
26 Aug	0:59	Benin	0–3	Egypt	14–25	17–25	18–25			49–75	

== Knockout stage ==
=== 5–8th place bracket ===
5th–8th places
August 28, Sidi Bou Said
South Africa	3
Botswana	0
August 28, Sidi Bou Said
Cameroon	3
Benin	0

Fifth place
August 29, Sidi Bou Said
Cameroon	3
South Africa	0
Seventh place
August 29, Sidi Bou Said
Benin	3
Botswana	0

==== Classification 5–8 places ====
Date	Time		Score		Set 1	Set 2	Set 3	Set 4	Set 5	Total	Report
28 Aug	1:13	South Africa	3–0	Botswana	25–15	25–16	25–19			75–50	
28 Aug	0:59	Cameroon	3–0	Benin	25–9	25–23	25–16			75–48	

==== Seventh place match ====
Date	Time		Score		Set 1	Set 2	Set 3	Set 4	Set 5	Total	Report
29 Aug	1:09	Botswana	0–3	Benin	28–26	25–15	25–14			78–55	

==== Fifth place match ====
Date	Time		Score		Set 1	Set 2	Set 3	Set 4	Set 5	Total	Report
29 Aug	1:10	Cameroon	3–0	South Africa	25–15	25–21	25–22			75–58	

=== Championship bracket ===
Semifinals
August 28 – Sidi Bou Said
Tunisia	3
Morocco	2
August 28 – Sidi Bou Said
Egypt	3
Algeria	2

Final
August 30 – Sidi Bou Said
Egypt	0
Tunisia	3
Third place
August 30 – Sidi Bou Said
Algeria	1
Morocco	3

==== Semifinals ====
Date	Time		Score		Set 1	Set 2	Set 3	Set 4	Set 5	Total	Report
28 Aug	1:44	Tunisia	3–2	Morocco	20–25	25–21	21–25	25–17	15–7	106–95	
28 Aug	1:55	Egypt	3–2	Algeria	25–19	25–27	22–25	25-16	15-13	112–71	

==== Bronze medal match ====
Date	Time		Score		Set 1	Set 2	Set 3	Set 4	Set 5	Total	Report
30 Aug	1:43	Algeria	1–3	Morocco	25–17	26–28	23–25	13–25		87–95	

==== Final ====
Date	Time		Score		Set 1	Set 2	Set 3	Set 4	Set 5	Total	Report
30 Aug	1:06	Egypt	0–3	Tunisia	18–25	22–25	23–25			63–75	

== Final standing ==
Rank	Team
Gold medal	Tunisia
Silver medal	Egypt
Bronze medal	Morocco
4	Algeria
5	Cameroon
6	South Africa
7	Benin
8	Botswana

Qualified for the 2009 Junior World Championship

2008 African Junior champions

Tunisia
Seventh title

Team roster

Bahri Ben Massoud (L), Aymen Karoui, Ibrahim Besbes, Marouane M'rabet, Skander Ben Mansour, Hamza Rezgui (C), Ismail Moalla, Ahmed Kadhi, Hamza Nagga, Rami Bennour, Elyes Karamosly, Chokri Jouini

Head coach: Hedi Karray

== Awards ==
- MVP: (Tunisia) Elyes Karamosly
- Best spiker: (Morocco) Mohamed Allaoui
- Best blocker: (Egypt) Mamdouh Abdel Moneim
- Best server: (Tunisia) Chokri Jouini
- Best digger: (Algeria) Sofiane Sahi
- Best setter: (Egypt) Mohamed Badr
- Best receiver: (Tunisia) Bahri Ben Massoud
