= Elyes Karamosli =

Tunisian volleyball player (born 1989)

Personal information
- Full name: Elyes Karamosli
- Nationality: Tunisia
- Born: August 22, 1989; Hammam-Lif, Tunisia
- Hometown: Tunis, Tunisia
- Height: 1.98 m (6 ft 6 in)
- Weight: 83 kg (183 lb)

Volleyball information
- Position: Outside hitter
- Current club: (Tunisia) ES Tunis
- Number: 8

National team
2009 -	Tunisia
Honours
African Championships
Silver medal – second place	2013 Sousse	Team
Mediterranean Games
Silver medal – second place	2013 Mersin	Team
- Last updated: December 2013

Elyes Karamosli (born 22 August 1989 in Hammam-Lif, Tunisia) is a Tunisian volleyball player. He is 198 cm tall and plays as outside hitter. His brother Hosni also represented Tunisia in Olympic volleyball.

== Clubs ==
Club	Nation	Years
CS Hammam Lif	Tunisia	?–2008
Espérance de Tunis	Tunisia	2008–

== Awards ==
=== Club ===
- 1 African Championship (2014)
- 1 Arab Clubs Championship (2014)
- 1 Tunisian League (2015)
- 2 Tunisian Cup (2010, 2014)
- 1 Tunisian Super Cup (2009)

=== National team ===
- 1 Arab Championship (2012)
- 1 African Championship U21 (2008)
