= Elyes =

Elyes is a given name. It is the given name of the following people:

- Elyes Gabel (born 1983), English actor
- Elyes Fakhfakh, Tunisian politician
- Elyes Karamosli (born 1989 in Hammam-Lif, Tunisia), Tunisian volleyball player
- Elyes Garfi (born 1993), Tunisian volleyball player
