= Guidara =

Guidara is a surname. Notable people with the surname include:

- Ghazi Guidara (born 1974), Tunisian volleyball player
- Tomás Guidara (born 1996), Argentine footballer
- Will Guidara (born 1979), American restaurateur
