= Arab Volleyball Championship =

Sport competition for national teams

- Most recent season or competition: 2026 Arab Volleyball Championship
- Sport: Volleyball
- Founded: 1977; 49 years ago
- First season: 1977
- No. of teams: 6 (2026)
- Continent: AVA (Arab World)
- Most recent champion: Bahrain (4th title)
- Most titles: Tunisia (8 titles)

The Arab Volleyball Championship is the official competition for senior men's national volleyball teams of the Arab World, organized by the Arab Volleyball Association (AVA). The first edition was held in 1977.

The current champion are Bahrain, which won its twelfth title at the 2026 tournament, while, Tunisia is the most successful team, having won eight titles.

== Results ==
Ed.	Year	Host	(gold) Champion	(silver) Runner-up	(bronze) Third place
1	1977	Kuwait	Kuwait	Morocco	Saudi Arabia
2	1980	Syria	Tunisia	Syria	Saudi Arabia
3	1984	Tunisia	Tunisia	Algeria	Kuwait
4	1986	Jordan	Egypt	Iraq	Kuwait
5	1988	Saudi Arabia	Tunisia	Kuwait	Iraq
6	1992	Syria	Bahrain	Syria	Kuwait
7	1994	Bahrain	Algeria	Kuwait	Tunisia
8	1996	Egypt	Tunisia	Qatar	Algeria
9	1998	Bahrain	Algeria	Tunisia	Bahrain
10	2000	Jordan	Tunisia	Algeria	Qatar
11	2002	Jordan	Tunisia	Algeria	Egypt
12	2006	Bahrain	Tunisia	Saudi Arabia	Algeria
13	2008	Bahrain	Bahrain	Tunisia	Qatar
14	2012	Bahrain	Tunisia	Bahrain	Libya
15	2014	Kuwait	Egypt	Qatar	Algeria
16	2016	Egypt	Egypt	Bahrain	Iraq
17	2018	Egypt	Egypt	Bahrain	Oman
18	2024	Bahrain	Bahrain	Qatar	Tunisia
19	2026	Jordan	Bahrain	Oman	Saudi Arabia

=== Total Hosts ===
Hosts	Nations (Year(s))
6	Bahrain (1994, 1998, 2006, 2008, 2012, 2024)
4	Jordan (1986, 2000, 2002, 2026)
3	Egypt (1996, 2016, 2018)
2	Syria (1980, 1992); Kuwait (1977, 2014)
1	Tunisia (1984); Saudi Arabia (1988)

=== Medal table ===
Rank	Nation	Gold	Silver	Bronze	Total
1	Tunisia	8	2	2	12
2	Bahrain	4	3	1	8
3	Egypt	4	0	1	5
4	Algeria	2	3	3	8
5	Kuwait	1	2	3	6
6	Qatar	0	3	2	5
7	Syria	0	2	0	2
8	Saudi Arabia	0	1	3	4
9	Iraq	0	1	2	3
10	Oman	0	1	1	2
11	Morocco	0	1	0	1
12	Libya	0	0	1	1
Totals (12 entries)		19	19	19	57

== Participating nations ==
Nation	(Kuwait) 1977	(Syria) 1980	(Tunisia) 1984	(Jordan) 1986	(Saudi Arabia) 1988	(Syria) 1992	(Bahrain) 1994	(Egypt) 1996	(Bahrain) 1998	(Jordan) 2000	(Jordan) 2002	(Bahrain) 2006	(Bahrain) 2008	(Bahrain) 2012	(Kuwait) 2014	(Egypt) 2016	(Egypt) 2018	(Bahrain) 2024	(Jordan) 2026	Years
Algeria			2nd				1st	3rd	1st	2nd	2nd	3rd	4th		3rd		4th	•	4th	11
Bahrain						1st			3rd			4th	1st	2nd	5th	2nd	2nd	1st	1st	11
Egypt				1st							3rd				1st	1st	1st	•	•	5
Iraq				2nd	3rd							10th		5th	8th	3rd		5th	•	7
Jordan											4th			7th		6th		8th	6th	5
Kuwait	1st		3rd	3rd	2nd	3rd	2nd					9th		6th	4th			6th	5th	11
Lebanon												7th						•	•	1
Libya														3rd	7th			•	•	3
Morocco	2nd																	•	•	1
Oman												6th	6th				3rd	4th	2nd	5
Palestine																7th		•	•	1
Qatar								2nd		3rd		5th	3rd		2nd			2nd	•	6
Saudi Arabia	3rd	3rd										2nd		4th	6th	5th		7th	3rd	7
Somalia	11th																	•	•	1
Sudan												8th						•	•	1
Syria		2nd				2nd												•	•	2
Tunisia		1st	1st		1st		3rd	1st	2nd	1st	1st	1st	2nd	1st				3rd	•	12
United Arab Emirates													5th	8th		4th		•	•	3
Yemen															9th			•	•	1
Total	12	10					8	6	6	6	10	10	6	8	9	7		8	6	
