= 2003 Men's African Volleyball Championship =

2003 African Volleyball Championship
Tournament details
- Host country: Egypt
- Dates: August 01–06
- Teams: 8
- Venues: 2 (in 1 host city)

Final positions
- Champions: Tunisia (8th title)

The 2003 Men's African Volleyball Championship was held in Cairo, Egypt, from August 1 to August 6, 2003.

== Teams ==
- Algeria
- DR Congo
- Cameroon
- Egypt
- Morocco
- South Africa
- Rwanda
- Tunisia

== Group stage ==
=== Group A ===
| Pos | Team | Pld | W | L | Pts | SW | SL | SR | SPW | SPL | SPR | Qualification |
|---|---|---|---|---|---|---|---|---|---|---|---|---|
| 1 | Egypt | 3 | 3 | 0 | 6 | 9 | 1 | 9.000 | 248 | 185 | 1.341 | Semifinals |
| 2 | Tunisia | 3 | 2 | 1 | 5 | 7 | 3 | 2.333 | 247 | 198 | 1.247 | Semifinals |
| 3 | DR Congo | 3 | 1 | 2 | 4 | 3 | 7 | 0.429 | 195 | 235 | 0.830 | |
| 4 | Rwanda | 3 | 0 | 3 | 3 | 1 | 9 | 0.111 | 178 | 250 | 0.712 | |

| Date | Time | | Score | | Set 1 | Set 2 | Set 3 | Set 4 | Set 5 | Total | Report |
|---|---|---|---|---|---|---|---|---|---|---|---|
| 01 Aug | | DR Congo | 3–1 | Rwanda | 25–20 | 25–27 | 25–17 | 25–21 | | 100–85 | |
| 01 Aug | | Egypt | 3–1 | Tunisia | 26–24 | 25–22 | 19–25 | 28-26 | | 98–71 | |
| 02 Aug | | Tunisia | 3-0 | DR Congo | 25-13 | 25-17 | 25-16 | | | 75–0 | |
| 02 Aug | | Egypt | 3–0 | Rwanda | 25-09 | 25-15 | 25–15 | | | 75–15 | |
| 03 Aug | | Egypt | 3–0 | DR Congo | 25–19 | 25–11 | 25–19 | | | 75–49 | |
| 03 Aug | | Tunisia | 3–0 | Rwanda | 25–15 | 25–19 | 25–22 | | | 75–56 | |

=== Group B ===
| Pos | Team | Pld | W | L | Pts | SW | SL | SR | SPW | SPL | SPR | Qualification |
|---|---|---|---|---|---|---|---|---|---|---|---|---|
| 1 | Algeria | 3 | 3 | 0 | 6 | 9 | 3 | 3.000 | 280 | 254 | 1.102 | Semifinals |
| 2 | Cameroon | 3 | 2 | 1 | 5 | 8 | 3 | 2.667 | 250 | 210 | 1.190 | Semifinals |
| 3 | Morocco | 3 | 1 | 2 | 4 | 4 | 6 | 0.667 | 216 | 234 | 0.923 | |
| 4 | South Africa | 3 | 0 | 3 | 3 | 0 | 9 | 0.000 | 179 | 225 | 0.796 | |

| Date | Time | | Score | | Set 1 | Set 2 | Set 3 | Set 4 | Set 5 | Total | Report |
|---|---|---|---|---|---|---|---|---|---|---|---|
| 01 Aug | | Cameroon | 3–0 | Morocco | 25–19 | 25–14 | 25–20 | | | 75–53 | |
| 01 Aug | | Algeria | 3–0 | South Africa | 27-25 | 25–23 | 25–18 | | | 77–41 | |
| 02 Aug | | Morocco | 3–0 | South Africa | 25–21 | 25–18 | 25–23 | | | 75–62 | |
| 02 Aug | | Algeria | 3–2 | Cameroon | 25–19 | 20-25 | 25-16 | 19–25 | 17-15 | 106–44 | |
| 03 Aug | | Algeria | 3–1 | Morocco | 25–20 | 25–22 | 22–25 | 25-19 | | 97–67 | |
| 03 Aug | | Cameroon | 3–0 | South Africa | 25–16 | 25–13 | 25–22 | | | 75–51 | |

== Knockout stage ==
=== Seventh place match ===
| Date | Time | | Score | | Set 1 | Set 2 | Set 3 | Set 4 | Set 5 | Total | Report |
|---|---|---|---|---|---|---|---|---|---|---|---|
| 05 Aug | | South Africa | 3-2 | Rwanda | 26-28 | 25–16 | 25–16 | 20–25 | 15-11 | 111–57 | |

=== Fifth place match ===
| Date | Time | | Score | | Set 1 | Set 2 | Set 3 | Set 4 | Set 5 | Total | Report |
|---|---|---|---|---|---|---|---|---|---|---|---|
| 05 Aug | | Morocco | 3–0 | DR Congo | 25–18 | 25–11 | 27–25 | | | 77–54 | |

=== Championship bracket ===
Semifinals
August 05 – Cairo
Tunisia | 3
Algeria | 1
August 05 – Cairo
Egypt | 3
Cameroon | 1

Final
August 06 – Cairo
Egypt | 0
Tunisia | 3
Third place
August 06 – Cairo
Algeria | 0
Cameroon | 3

==== Semifinals ====
| Date | Time | | Score | | Set 1 | Set 2 | Set 3 | Set 4 | Set 5 | Total | Report |
|---|---|---|---|---|---|---|---|---|---|---|---|
| 05 Aug | | Tunisia | 3–1 | Algeria | 29-31 | 25-22 | 25-22 | 25–16 | | 104–16 | |
| 05 Aug | | Egypt | 3–1 | Cameroon | 25–15 | 25–18 | 28-30 | 25-21 | | 103–33 | |

==== Bronze medal match ====
| Date | Time | | Score | | Set 1 | Set 2 | Set 3 | Set 4 | Set 5 | Total | Report |
|---|---|---|---|---|---|---|---|---|---|---|---|
| 06 Aug | | Algeria | 0–3 | Cameroon | 20-25 | 17-25 | 23-25 | | | 60–0 | |

==== Final ====
| Date | Time | | Score | | Set 1 | Set 2 | Set 3 | Set 4 | Set 5 | Total | Report |
|---|---|---|---|---|---|---|---|---|---|---|---|
| 06 Aug | | Egypt | 0–3 | Tunisia | 19–25 | 24–26 | 25–27 | | | 68–78 | |

== Final standing ==
| Rank | Team |
|---|---|
| 1st place, gold medalist(s) | Tunisia |
| 2nd place, silver medalist(s) | Egypt |
| 3rd place, bronze medalist(s) | Cameroon |
| 4 | Algeria |
| 5 | Morocco |
| 6 | DR Congo |
| 7 | South Africa |
| 8 | Rwanda |

| Qualified for the 2003 FIVB Men's World Cup |

2003 Men's African champions

Tunisia
Eighth title

== Awards ==
- Best scorer: (Tunisia) Noureddine Hfaiedh
- Best digger: (Egypt) Wael Alaydy
- Best spiker: (Egypt) Hamdy El-Safy
- Best blocker: (Cameroon) Ndaki Mboulet
- Best server: (Cameroon) Nanga Guy
- Best setter: (Tunisia) Ghazi Guidara
- Best reception: (Algeria) Dif Hassan
