= Wassim Ben Tara =

Tunisian volleyball player (born 1996)

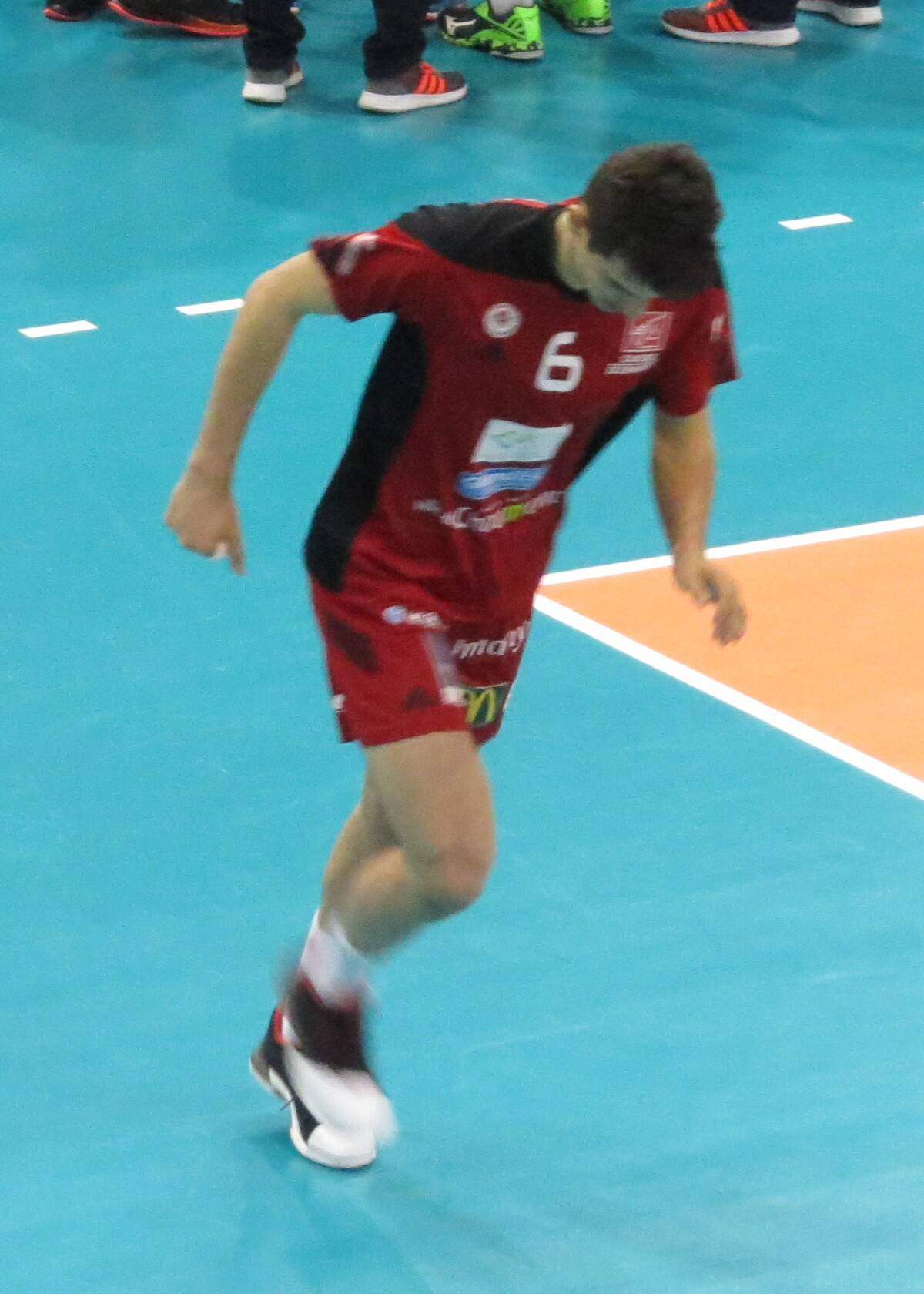
- Ben Tara with Chaumont VB 52 in 2017

Personal information
- Nationality: Tunisian; Polish
- Born: 3 August 1996 (age 30) Tunis, Tunisia
- Height: 2.04 m (6 ft 8 in)
- Weight: 90 kg (198 lb)
- Spike: 365 cm (144 in)
- Block: 340 cm (134 in)

Volleyball information
- Position: Opposite
- Current club: Suntory Sunbirds Osaka
- Number: 10

Career
- Years: Team
- 2014–2016 2016–2019 2019–2020 2020–2023 2023–2026 2026–: ASUL Lyon Volley; Chaumont VB 52; GFC Ajaccio VB; Stal Nysa; Sir Safety Perugia; Suntory Sunbirds Osaka

National team
- Years: Team
- 2015–: Tunisia
Honours
Men's volleyball
Representing Tunisia
CAVB African Championship
Gold medal – first place	2017 Cairo
Gold medal – first place	2021 Kigali
Silver medal – second place	2015 Cairo

Wassim Ben Tara (Arabic: وسيم بن طارة; born 3 August 1996) is a Tunisian professional volleyball player of Polish descent who plays as an opposite spiker for SV League club Suntory Sunbirds and the Tunisia national team.

== Honours ==
=== Clubs ===
==== CEV Champions League ====
- 2024–25, with Sir Sicoma Perugia
- 2025–26, with Sir Sicoma Perugia

==== CEV Challenge Cup ====
- 2016–17, with Chaumont VB 52

==== FIVB Club World Championship ====
- 2023, with Sir Sicoma Perugia
- 2025, with Sir Sicoma Perugia

==== National championships ====
- 2016–17 French Championship, with Chaumont VB 52
- 2017–18 French SuperCup, with Chaumont VB 52
- 2023–24 Italian Super Cup, with Sir Susa Perugia
- 2023–24 Italian Cup, with Sir Susa Perugia
- 2023–24 Italian Championship, with Sir Susa Perugia
- 2024–25 Italian Super Cup, with Sir Susa Perugia
- 2024–25 Italian Championship, with Sir Susa Perugia

=== Youth national team ===
- 2013 CAVB U21 African Championship
- 2014 CAVB U23 African Championship

=== Individual awards ===
- 2021: CAVB African Championship – Best spiker
- 2023: Italian SuperCup – Most valuable player
