= Hichem Kaabi =

Tunisian volleyball player (born 1986)

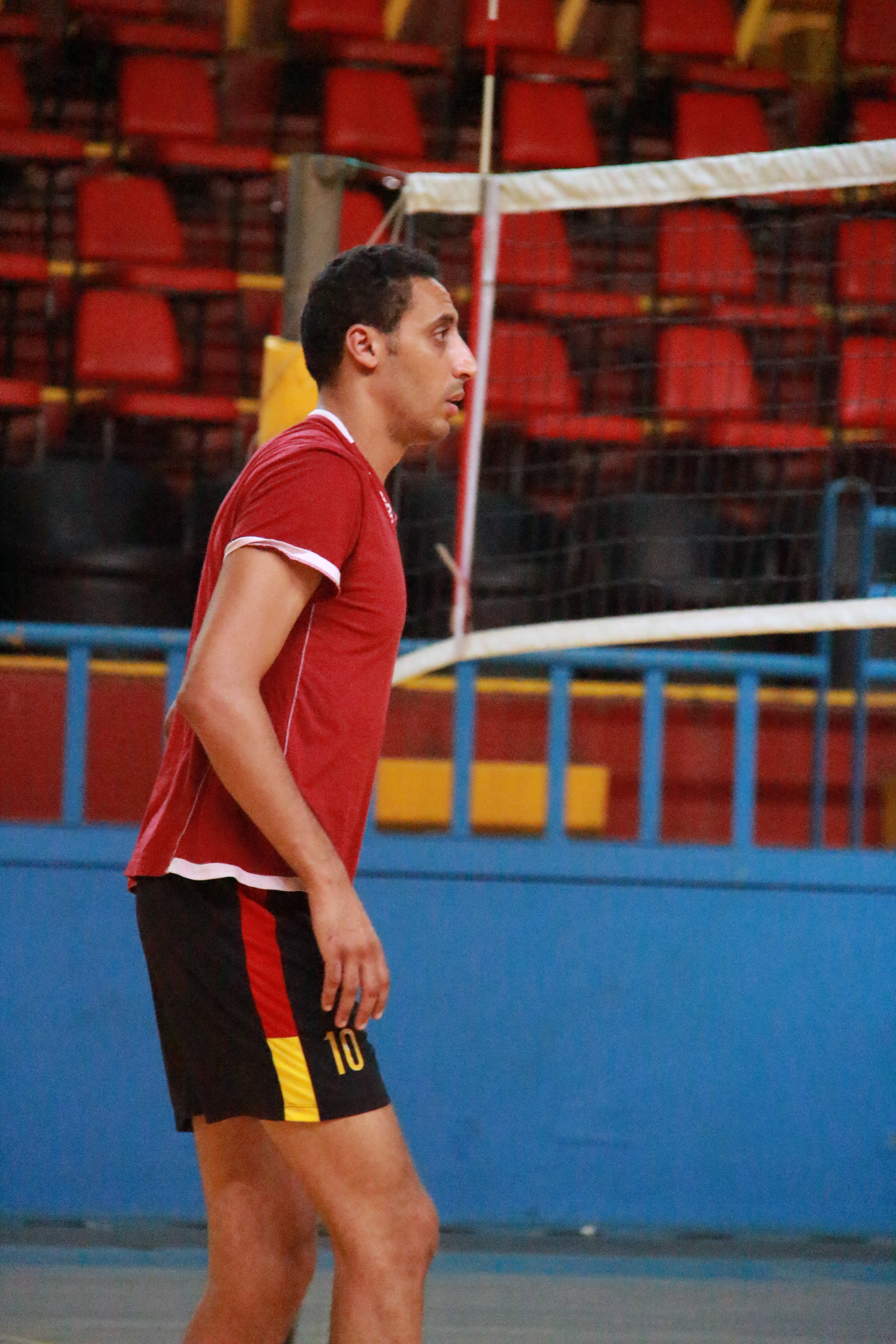

Personal information
- Nationality: Tunisia
- Born: 13 September 1986 (age 40)
- Height: 1.94 m (6 ft 4 in)
- Weight: 82 kg (181 lb)
- Spike: 340 cm (130 in)
- Block: 315 cm (124 in)

Volleyball information
- Number: 16

Career
| Years | Teams |
|---|---|
| 2012 | (Tunisia) E.S. Tunis |

National team
| 2012– | Tunisia |

Hichem Kaabi (born 13 September 1986) is a Tunisian male volleyball player. He is part of the Tunisia men's national volleyball team. He competed with the national team at the 2012 Summer Olympics in London, Great Britain. He played with E.S. Tunis in 2012.

== Clubs ==
- (Tunisia) E.S. Tunis (2012)

== See also ==
- Tunisia at the 2012 Summer Olympics
