= 1979 Men's African Volleyball Championship =

The 1979 Men's African Volleyball Championship was in Tripoli, Libya, with 5 teams participating in the continental championship.

== Teams ==
- Libya
- Madagascar
- Nigeria
- Senegal
- Tunisia

== Results ==
20 November 1979	Tunisia	3–0	Senegal	Tripoli

== Final ranking ==
Rank	Team
1st place, gold medalist(s)	Tunisia
2nd place, silver medalist(s)	Libya
3rd place, bronze medalist(s)	Madagascar
4	Senegal
5	Nigeria

Qualified for the 1981 FIVB Men's World Cup, the 1982 FIVB Men's Volleyball World Championship and the 1980 Summer Olympics (Withdrew and replaced by Libya)
Qualified for the 1982 FIVB Men's Volleyball World Championship

1979 Men's African champions

Tunisia
Third title
