= Bahri Messaoud =

Tunisian volleyball player (born 1991)

Personal information
- Nationality: Tunisia
- Born: 21 June 1991 (age 35)
- Height: 185 cm (6 ft 1 in)
- Weight: 80 kg (176 lb)
- Spike: 320 cm (126 in)
- Block: 290 cm (114 in)

Volleyball information
- Number: 23 (national team)

Career
Years	Teams
2015	C.S.Sfaxien

National team
2015	Tunisia

Bahri Messaoud (born 21 June 1991) is a Tunisian male volleyball player. He is part of the Tunisia men's national volleyball team. On club level he plays for C.S.Sfaxien.
