= Mehdi Gara =

Tunisian volleyball player (born 1981)

Personal information
- Nationality: Tunisia
- Born: 1 March 1981 (age 45)
- Height: 1.89 m (6 ft 2 in)
- Weight: 78 kg (172 lb)
- Spike: 332 cm (131 in)
- Block: 317 cm (125 in)

Volleyball information
- Number: 3

Career
Years	Teams
2004	(Tunisia) C.O. Kelibia

National team
2004	Tunisia

Mehdi Gara, also noted as Mahdi Gara, (born 1 March 1981) is a former Tunisian male volleyball player. He was part of the Tunisia men's national volleyball team. He competed with the national team at the 2004 Summer Olympics in Athens, Greece. He played with C.O. Kelibia in 2004.

== Clubs ==
- (Tunisia) C.O. Kelibia (2004)

== See also ==
- Tunisia at the 2004 Summer Olympics
