= Aymen Bouguerra =

Tunisian volleyball player (born 2001)

Personal information
- Born: 1 November 2001 (age 24); Tunis, Tunisia
- Height: 2.00 m (6 ft 7 in)
- Weight: 90 kg (198 lb)
- Spike: 350 cm (138 in)

Volleyball information
- Position: Outside hitter
- Current club: Wolfdogs Nagoya

Career
| Years | Teams |
|---|---|
| –2022; 2022–2023; 2023–2024; 2024–2025; 2025– | Narbonne Volley; Stade Poitevin Poitiers; Norwid Częstochowa; GKS Katowice; Wolfdogs Nagoya |

National team
| Tunisia |

Aymen Bouguerra (born 1 November 2001) is a Tunisian professional volleyball player who plays as an outside hitter for Wolfdogs Nagoya and the Tunisia national team. He competed in the 2020 Olympic Games.

== Honours ==
=== Club ===
- CEV Challenge Cup
  - 2021–22 – with Narbonne Volley
