= Khaled Belaïd =

Tunisian volleyball player (born 1973)

Personal information
- Nationality: Tunisia
- Born: 30 December 1973 (age 52)
- Height: 1.95 m (6 ft 5 in)
- Weight: 82 kg (181 lb)
- Spike: 326 cm (128 in)
- Block: 312 cm (123 in)

Volleyball information
- Number: 9

Career
| Years | Teams |
|---|---|
| 2004 | (Tunisia) CS Sfaxien |

National team
| 2004 | Tunisia |

Khaled Belaïd (born 30 December 1973) is a former Tunisian male volleyball player. He was part of the Tunisia men's national volleyball team. He competed with the national team at the 2004 Summer Olympics in Athens, Greece. He played with CS Sfaxien in 2004.

== Clubs ==
- (Tunisia) CS Sfaxien (2004)

== See also ==
- Tunisia at the 2004 Summer Olympics
