= Mehrez Berriri =

Tunisian volleyball player (born 1975)

Personal information
- Nationality: Tunisia
- Born: 13 April 1975 (age 51)
- Height: 1.86 m (6 ft 1 in)
- Weight: 80 kg (176 lb)
- Spike: 328 cm (129 in)
- Block: 305 cm (120 in)

Volleyball information
- Number: 14

Career
Years	Teams
2004	(Tunisia) CS Sfaxien

National team
2004	Tunisia

Mehrez Berriri (born 13 April 1975) is a former Tunisian male volleyball player. He was part of the Tunisia men's national volleyball team. He competed with the national team at the 2004 Summer Olympics in Athens, Greece. He played with CS Sfaxien in 2004.

== Clubs ==
- (Tunisia) CS Sfaxien (2004)

== See also ==
- Tunisia at the 2004 Summer Olympics
