= 2005 Men's African Volleyball Championship =

The 2005 Men's African Volleyball Championship was in Egypt, with 10 teams participating in the continental championship.

== Teams ==
- Cameroon
- South Africa
- Rwanda
- Egypt
- Tunisia
- Botswana
- Nigeria
- Morocco
- DR Congo
- Sudan

== Preliminary round ==
=== Group A ===
	Team	Points	G	W	L	PW	PL	Ratio	SW	SL	Ratio
1.	Egypt	8	4	4	0	332	258	1.287	12	2	6.000
2.	Cameroon	7	4	3	1	391	352	1.11	11	6	1.833
3.	Nigeria	6	4	2	2	314	331	0.949	7	8	0.875
4.	South Africa	5	4	1	3	318	349	0.911	5	10	0.500
5	Botswana	4	4	0	4	295	360	0.819	3	12	0.250

=== Group B ===
	Team	Points	G	W	L	PW	PL	Ratio	SW	SL	Ratio
1.	Tunisia	8	4	4	0	318	225	1.413	12	1	12.000
2.	Morocco	6	4	2	2	347	331	1.048	9	7	1.286
3.	Rwanda	6	4	2	2	269	273	0.985	6	6	1.000
4.	DR Congo	6	4	2	2	318	344	0.952	6	9	0.667
5.	Sudan	4	4	0	4	258	347	0.744	2	12	0.167

== Final round ==
Semifinals
September 28 – Cairo
Egypt	3
Morocco	0
September 28 – Cairo
Tunisia	3
Cameroon	2

Final
September 29 – Cairo
Egypt	3
Tunisia	1
Third place
September 29 – Cairo
Cameroon	3
Morocco	0

== Final ranking ==
Rank	Team
1st place, gold medalist(s)	Egypt
2nd place, silver medalist(s)	Tunisia
3rd place, bronze medalist(s)	Cameroon
4	Morocco
5	
6	
7	
8	
9	
10	

2005 Men's African champions

Egypt
Third title
