= Walid Ben Abbes =

Tunisian volleyball player (born 1980)

Personal information
- Nationality: Tunisia
- Born: 19 June 1980 (age 46)
- Height: 1.86 m (6 ft 1 in)
- Weight: 76 kg (168 lb)
- Spike: 331 cm (130 in)
- Block: 308 cm (121 in)

Volleyball information
- Number: 10 (national team)

Career
- Years: Team
- –: E.S.Sahel, TUN

National team
- Years: Team
- –: Tunisia

Walid Ben Abbes (born 19 June 1980) is a former Tunisian male volleyball player. He was part of the Tunisia men's national volleyball team. He competed with the national team at the 2004 Summer Olympics in Athens, Greece. On club level he played for E.S.Sahel, TUN.

== See also ==
- Tunisia at the 2004 Summer Olympics
