= Libya men's national volleyball team =

Libya
- Association: Libyan Volleyball Federation (LVBF)
- Confederation: CAVB
- Head coach: Riadh Hedhili
- FIVB ranking: 86 ▲15 (1 October 2026)

Uniforms
Home	Away

Summer Olympics
- Appearances: 1 (First in 1980)
- Best result: 10th (1980)

World Championship
- Appearances: 2 (First in 1982)
- Best result: 24th (1982)

African Championship
- Appearances: 6 (First in 1967)
- Best result: (1979)
Honours
African Championship
Silver medal – second place	1979 Tripoli	Team
Bronze medal – third place	2023 Cairo	Team
Arab Championship
Silver medal – second place	2012 Bahrain	Team

The Libya men's national volleyball team represents Libya in international volleyball competitions and friendly matches.

== Competition record ==
=== Olympic Games ===
- (Soviet Union) 1980 — 10th place

=== World Championship ===
- (Argentina) 1982 — 24th place
- (Philippines) 2025 — 28th place

=== African Championship ===
- 1967 - 4th
- 1979 - (silver) Runners-up
- 2009 - 6th
- 2013 - 6th
- 2017 - 7th
- 2023 - (bronze) 3rd place

=== Arab Championship ===
- (Bahrain) 2012 – (bronze) 3rd place
- (Kuwait) 2014 – 7th place
