= Msaddak Lahmar =

Tunisian volleyball player (born 1960)

Personal information
- Nationality: Tunisian
- Born: 30 October 1960 (age 64)

Sport
- Sport: Volleyball

Msaddak Lahmar (born 30 October 1960) is a Tunisian volleyball player. He competed at the 1984 Summer Olympics and the 1988 Summer Olympics.
