= Anouer Taouerghi =

Tunisian volleyball player (born 1983)

Personal information
- Nationality: Tunisia
- Born: 17 August 1983 (age 43); Sfax, Tunisia
- Height: 1.78 m (5 ft 10 in)
- Weight: 77 kg (170 lb)
- Spike: 302 cm (119 in)
- Block: 292 cm (115 in)

Career
Years	Teams
2012–2013	(Tunisia) CS Sfaxien

National team
2012–	Tunisia

Anouer Taouerghi (born 17 August 1983) is a Tunisian male volleyball player. He is part of the Tunisia men's national volleyball team. He competed with the national team at the 2012 Summer Olympics in London, Great Britain. He played with CS Sfaxien in 2012 and competed with the club at the 2013 FIVB Volleyball Men's Club World Championship.

== Clubs ==
- (Tunisia) CS Sfaxien (2012–2013)

== See also ==
- Tunisia at the 2012 Summer Olympics
