= Mohamed Trabelsi =

Tunisian footballer

Mohamed Trabelsi (born 7 January 1968), also known as Bakkaou, is a retired Tunisian footballer who played as defender.

Trabelsi played for Océano Club de Kerkennah, as well as for Club Africain and Stade Tunisien.

As a member of the Tunisia national football team, he was capped eight times and appeared for the national squad at the 1994 African Cup of Nations finals in Tunisia.

== Wins as player ==
- Arab Champions League
  - Winner: 1997
