= 2013 Men's African Volleyball Championship =

2013 Men's African Championship

Tournament details
- Host country: Tunisia
- Dates: September 22–27
- Teams: 6
- Venue: 1 (in 1 host city)

The 2013 Men's African Volleyball Championship was the 19th edition of the Men's African Volleyball Championship, organised by Africa's governing volleyball body, the CAVB. It was held in Sousse, Tunisia from September 22 to 27, 2013.

== Teams ==
- Algeria
- Cameroon
- Egypt
- Libya
- Morocco
- Tunisia

== Venue ==
| Sousse | Sousse (Tunisia) |
| Sousse Indoor Sports Hall | Sousse (Tunisia) |
| Capacity: 5,000 | Sousse (Tunisia) |

== Format ==
The competition system of the 2013 Men's African Championship is the single Round-Robin system. Each team plays once against each of the 5 remaining teams. Points are accumulated during the whole tournament, and the final ranking is determined by the total points gained.

== Results ==
- All times are Central European Time (UTC+01:00).

| Pos | Team | Pld | W | L | Pts | SW | SL | SR | SPW | SPL | SPR |
|---|---|---|---|---|---|---|---|---|---|---|---|
| 1 | Egypt | 5 | 5 | 0 | 14 | 15 | 5 | 3.000 | 473 | 397 | 1.191 |
| 2 | Tunisia | 5 | 4 | 1 | 10 | 13 | 8 | 1.625 | 485 | 464 | 1.045 |
| 3 | Morocco | 5 | 3 | 2 | 7 | 11 | 11 | 1.000 | 483 | 495 | 0.976 |
| 4 | Cameroon | 5 | 2 | 3 | 7 | 10 | 11 | 0.909 | 464 | 453 | 1.024 |
| 5 | Algeria | 5 | 1 | 4 | 7 | 11 | 12 | 0.917 | 493 | 478 | 1.031 |
| 6 | Libya | 5 | 0 | 5 | 0 | 2 | 15 | 0.133 | 309 | 420 | 0.736 |

| Date | Time | | Score | | Set 1 | Set 2 | Set 3 | Set 4 | Set 5 | Total | Report |
|---|---|---|---|---|---|---|---|---|---|---|---|
| 22 Sep | 14:00 | Egypt | 3–0 | Cameroon | 25–17 | 25–21 | 25–23 | | | 75–61 | |
| 22 Sep | 16:00 | Algeria | 2–3 | Morocco | 25–21 | 20–25 | 25–22 | 18–25 | 13–15 | 101–108 | |
| 22 Sep | 18:00 | Tunisia | 3–0 | Libya | 25–14 | 25–19 | 25–16 | | | 75–49 | |
| 23 Sep | 14:00 | Morocco | 3–1 | Libya | 25–22 | 22–25 | 25–23 | 25–16 | | 97–86 | |
| 23 Sep | 16:00 | Cameroon | 3–2 | Algeria | 25–22 | 21–25 | 18–25 | 25–23 | 15–12 | 104–107 | |
| 23 Sep | 18:00 | Tunisia | 1–3 | Egypt | 25–22 | 20–25 | 23–25 | 20–25 | | 88–97 | |
| 24 Sep | 14:00 | Morocco | 3–2 | Cameroon | 25–23 | 25–20 | 26–28 | 17–25 | 15–13 | 108–109 | |
| 24 Sep | 16:00 | Egypt | 3–1 | Libya | 25–16 | 25–14 | 23–25 | 25–16 | | 98–71 | |
| 24 Sep | 18:00 | Tunisia | 3–2 | Algeria | 25–23 | 24–26 | 18–25 | 25–22 | 16–14 | 108–110 | |
| 26 Sep | 14:00 | Egypt | 3–2 | Algeria | 25–22 | 25–18 | 24–26 | 18–25 | 15–9 | 107–100 | |
| 26 Sep | 16:00 | Cameroon | 3–0 | Libya | 25–16 | 25–17 | 25–19 | | | 75–52 | |
| 26 Sep | 18:00 | Tunisia | 3–1 | Morocco | 27–29 | 26–24 | 25–22 | 25–18 | | 103–93 | |
| 27 Sep | 14:00 | Libya | 0–3 | Algeria | 20–25 | 16–25 | 15–25 | | | 51–75 | |
| 27 Sep | 16:00 | Morocco | 1–3 | Egypt | 25–21 | 18–25 | 12–25 | 22-25 | | 77–71 | |
| 27 Sep | 18:00 | Tunisia | 3–2 | Cameroon | 19–25 | 25–21 | 29–27 | 19–25 | 19–17 | 111–115 | |

== Final standing ==
| Rank | Team |
|---|---|
| Gold medal | Egypt |
| Silver medal | Tunisia |
| Bronze medal | Morocco |
| 4 | Cameroon |
| 5 | Algeria |
| 6 | Libya |

2013 Men's African champions

Egypt
7th title

== Awards ==
- MVP: (Egypt) Abdellatif Othman
- Best receiver: (Tunisia) Noureddine Hfaiedh
- Best spiker: (Morocco) Youssef Oughlef
- Best blocker: (Morocco) Kamel Ouali
- Best server: (Egypt) Ahmed Abdel Naeim
- Best setter: (Egypt) Abdallah Abdessalam
- Best libero: (Tunisia) Anouar Taouerghi
