= Naceur Ben Othman =

Tunisian volleyball player (born 1951)

Personal information
- Nationality: Tunisian
- Born: 17 November 1951 (age 73)

Sport
- Sport: Volleyball

Naceur Ben Othman (born 17 November 1951) is a Tunisian volleyball player. He competed in the men's tournament at the 1972 Summer Olympics.
