= Abdel Aziz Bousarsar =

Tunisian volleyball player (born 1948)

Personal information
- Nationality: Tunisian
- Born: 16 November 1948 (age 76)

Sport
- Sport: Volleyball

Abdel Aziz Bousarsar (born 16 November 1948) is a Tunisian volleyball player. He competed in the men's tournament at the 1972 Summer Olympics.
