= Hakim Zouari =

Tunisian volleyball player (born 1988)

Personal information
- Nationality: Tunisian
- Born: 28 March 1988 (age 37); Sfax, Tunisia

Sport
- Sport: Volleyball

Hakim Zouari (born 28 March 1988) is a Tunisian volleyball player. He competed in the men's tournament at the 2012 Summer Olympics.
