= 2008 Men's Arab Volleyball Championship =

Tournament details
- Host country: Bahrain
- Dates: December 18–23
- Teams: 6
- Venue: (in 1 host city)

Final positions
- Champions: Bahrain (1st title)

Tournament awards
- MVP: (Bahrain) Jassem Annabhan

The 2008 Men's Arab Volleyball Championship was held in Manama, Bahrain, from December 19 to December 23, 2008.

== Teams ==
- Algeria
- Bahrain
- Oman
- Qatar
- Tunisia
- United Arab Emirates

== Competition system ==
The competition system of the 2008 Men's Arab Volleyball Championship is the single Round-Robin system. Each team plays once against each of the 5 remaining teams. Points are accumulated during the whole tournament, and the final ranking is determined by the total points gained.

=== Championship ===
Pos	Team	Pld	W	L	Pts	SW	SL	SR	SPW	SPL	SPR
1	Bahrain	5	4	1	9	12	7	1.714	449	397	1.131
2	Tunisia	5	4	1	9	14	5	2.800	437	392	1.115
3	Qatar	5	3	2	8	11	10	1.100	452	432	1.046
4	Algeria	5	3	2	8	11	8	1.375	416	404	1.030
5	United Arab Emirates	5	1	4	6	4	12	0.333	316	389	0.812
6	Oman	5	0	5	5	5	15	0.333	409	465	0.880

== Results ==
Date	Time		Score		Set 1	Set 2	Set 3	Set 4	Set 5	Total	Report
18 Dec	12:30	Bahrain	3–1	United Arab Emirates	25–22	20–25	25–15	25-14		95–62	
18 Dec	14:30	Qatar	3–2	Algeria	19–25	22–25	25–18	25-15	16-14	107–68	
18 Dec	16:30	Tunisia	3–2	Oman	25–20	25–15	24–26	18-25	16-14	108–61	
19 Dec	12:30	Bahrain	3–1	Oman	25–22	27–29	25–14	25-18		102–65	
19 Dec	14:30	Algeria	3–2	Tunisia	25–23	25–15	19–25	26-28	15-12	110–63	
19 Dec	16:30	Qatar	3–0	United Arab Emirates	25–15	25–18	25–21			75–54	
20 Dec	12:30	Bahrain	3–0	Algeria	25–14	25–23	25–22			75–59	
20 Dec	14:30	Tunisia	3–0	Qatar	25–19	25–20	25–23			75–62	
20 Dec	16:30	United Arab Emirates	3–0	Oman	25–23	25–23	25–23			75–69	
22 Dec	12:30	Algeria	3–0	Oman	25–23	25–19	25–19			75–61	
22 Dec	14:30	Tunisia	3–0	United Arab Emirates	25–16	25–23	25–14			75–53	
22 Dec	16:30	Bahrain	3–2	Qatar	22–25	25–19	25–22	23-25	15-12	110–66	
23 Dec	12:30	Qatar	3–2	Oman	19–25	21–25	25–21	25-12	15-13	105–71	
23 Dec	14:30	Algeria	3–0	United Arab Emirates	25–18	25–18	25–22			75–58	
23 Dec	16:30	Tunisia	3–0	Bahrain	25–22	26–24	25–21			76–67	

== Final standing ==
Rank	Team
1st place, gold medalist(s)	Bahrain
2nd place, silver medalist(s)	Tunisia
3rd place, bronze medalist(s)	Qatar
4	Algeria
5	United Arab Emirates
6	Oman

== Awards ==
- MVP: (Bahrain) Jassem Annabhan
- Best spiker: (Tunisia) Marouen Garci
- Best blocker: (Bahrain) Fadhel Abbas
- Best server: (Qatar) Ali Isshak
- Best setter: (Tunisia) Seifeddine Al Majid
- Best receiver: (Qatar) Faraj Jumaa
- Best libero: (Bahrain) Aymen Harouna
