= Rashid Bousarsar =

Tunisian volleyball player (born 1959)

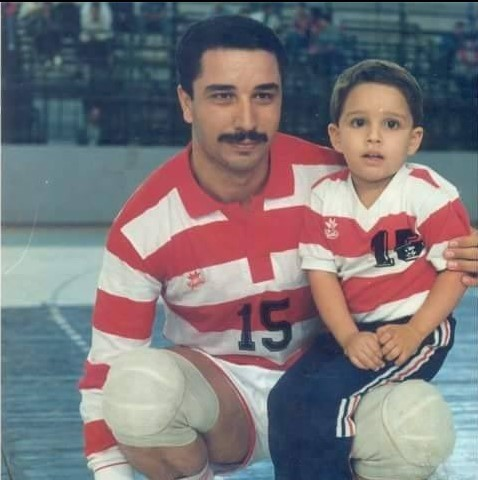

Personal information
- Nationality: Tunisian
- Born: 4 April 1959 (age 65)

Sport
- Sport: Volleyball

Rashid Bousarsar (born 4 April 1959) is a Tunisian volleyball player. He competed at the 1984 Summer Olympics and the 1988 Summer Olympics.
