= Mohamed Ayech =

Tunisian volleyball player (born 1991)

Personal information
- Nationality: Tunisia
- Born: 31 March 1991 (age 35)
- Height: 198 cm (6 ft 6 in)
- Weight: 86 kg (190 lb)
- Spike: 324 cm (128 in)
- Block: 310 cm (122 in)

Volleyball information
- Number: 18 (national team)

Career
Years	Teams
2014	E.S.Sahel

National team
2014	Tunisia

Mohamed Ayech (born 31 March 1991) is a Tunisian male volleyball player. He was part of the Tunisia men's national volleyball team. At club level he played for E.S.Sahel.
