= Hamouda Ben Massaoud =

Tunisian volleyball player (born 1945)

Personal information
- Nationality: Tunisian
- Born: 13 July 1945 (age 79)

Sport
- Sport: Volleyball

Hamouda Ben Massaoud (born 13 July 1945) is a Tunisian volleyball player. He competed in the men's tournament at the 1972 Summer Olympics.
