= Raja Hayder =

Tunisian volleyball player

Personal information
- Nationality: Tunisian
- Born: 31 August 1948
- Died: 12 June 1991

Sport
- Sport: Volleyball

Raja Hayder (August 31, 1948 - June 12, 1991) was a Tunisian volleyball player. He competed in the men's tournament at the 1972 Summer Olympics.
