= Tayeb Korbosli =

Tunisian volleyball player (born 1993)

Personal information
- Nationality: Tunisia
- Born: 5 June 1993 (age 33)
- Height: 188 cm (6 ft 2 in)
- Weight: 75 kg (165 lb)
- Spike: 280 cm (110 in)
- Block: 270 cm (106 in)

Volleyball information
- Number: 1 (national team)

Career
Years	Teams
2015	C O Kelibia

National team
2015	Tunisia

Tayeb Korbosli (born 5 June 1993) is a Tunisian male volleyball player. He is part of the Tunisia men's national volleyball team. On club level he plays for C O Kelibia.
