= Naceur Bounatouf =

Tunisian volleyball player (born 1949)

Personal information
- Nationality: Tunisian
- Born: 18 January 1949
- Died: 4 November 2018 (aged 69)

Sport
- Sport: Volleyball

Naceur Bounatouf (18 January 1949 – 4 November 2018) was a Tunisian volleyball player. He competed in the men's tournament at the 1972 Summer Olympics.
