= Samir Lamouchi =

Tunisian volleyball player (born 1951)

Personal information
- Nationality: Tunisian
- Born: 25 July 1951 (age 73)

Sport
- Sport: Volleyball

Samir Lamouchi (born 25 July 1951) is a Tunisian volleyball player. He competed in the men's tournament at the 1972 Summer Olympics.
