= Nabil Miladi =

Tunisian volleyball player (born 1988)

Personal information
- Nationality: Tunisia
- Born: 28 February 1988 (age 38)
- Height: 1.96 m (6 ft 5 in)
- Weight: 73 kg (161 lb)
- Spike: 355 cm (140 in)
- Block: 340 cm (134 in)

Volleyball information
- Number: 21

Career
Years	Teams
2014	(Tunisia) ES Tunis

National team
2014	Tunisia

Nabil Miladi (born 28 February 1988) is a Tunisian male volleyball player. He was part of the Tunisia men's national volleyball team at the 2014 FIVB Volleyball Men's World Championship in Poland. He played for ES Tunis.

== Clubs ==
- ES Tunis (2014)
