= Faycal Ben Amara =

Tunisian volleyball player (born 1970)

Personal information
- Nationality: Tunisian
- Born: 4 February 1970 (age 55)
- Height: 196 cm (6 ft 5 in)

Sport
- Sport: Volleyball

Faycal Ben Amara (born 4 February 1970) is a Tunisian volleyball player. He competed at the 1988 Summer Olympics and the 1996 Summer Olympics.
