= Moncef Ben Soltane =

Tunisian volleyball player (born 1948)

Personal information
- Nationality: Tunisian
- Born: 18 March 1948 (age 77)

Sport
- Sport: Volleyball

Moncef Ben Soltane (born 18 March 1948) is a Tunisian volleyball player. He competed in the men's tournament at the 1972 Summer Olympics.
