= Haykel Jerbi =

Tunisian volleyball player (born 1988)

Personal information
- Nationality: Tunisia
- Born: 4 April 1988 (age 38)
- Height: 199 m (652 ft 11 in)
- Weight: 81 kg (179 lb)
- Spike: 345 cm (136 in)
- Block: 305 cm (120 in)

Volleyball information
- Number: 13

Career
Years	Teams
2010	ASHAOUARIA

National team
2010	Tunisia

Haykel Jerbi (born 4 April 1988) Tunisian male volleyball player. He was part of the Tunisia men's national volleyball team at the 2010 FIVB Volleyball Men's World Championship in Italy. He played for ASHAOUARIA.

== Clubs ==
- ASHAOUARIA (2010)
