= Mehdi Ben Cheikh =

Tunisian volleyball player (born 1979)

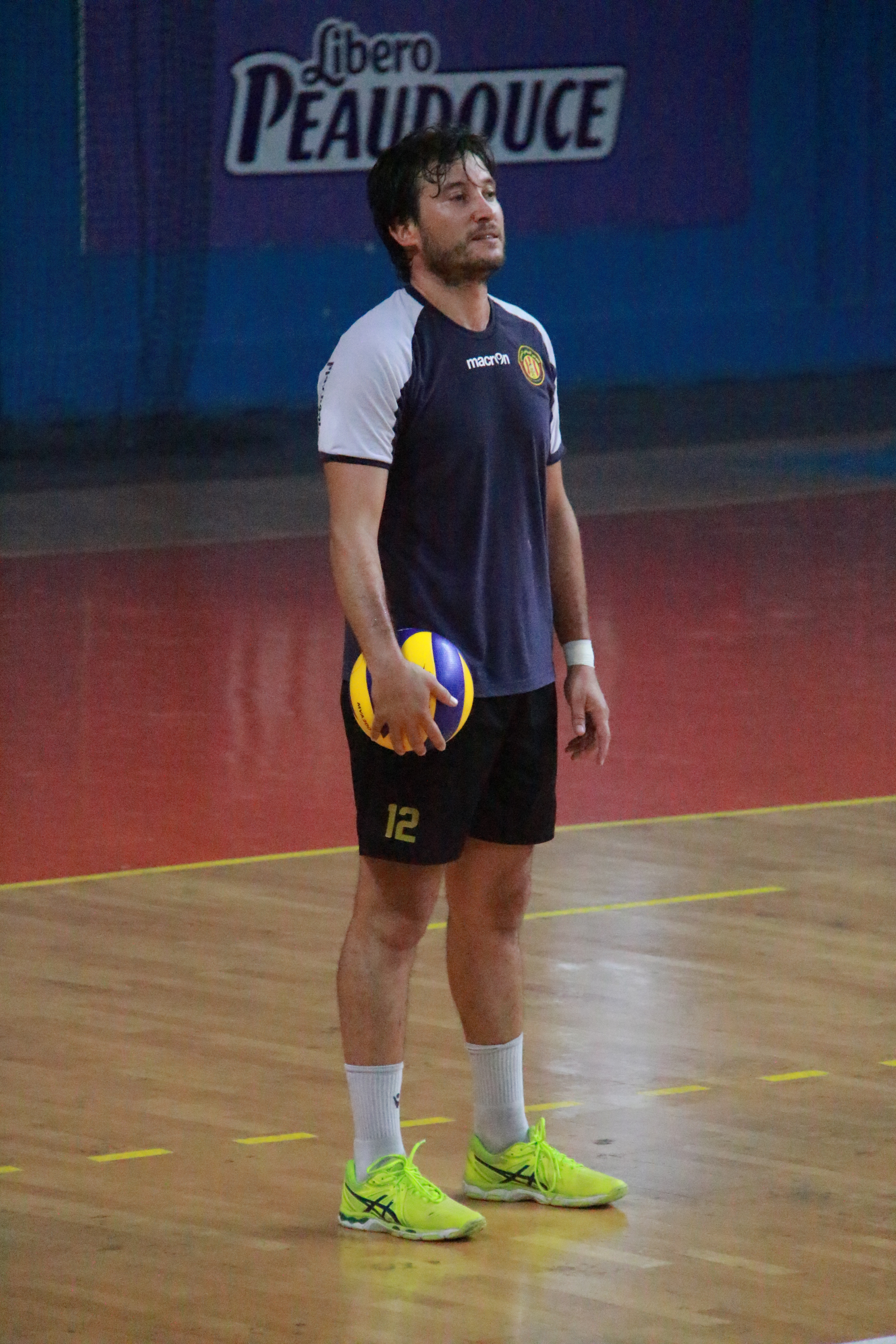
- Ben Cheikh in 2017

Personal information
- Nationality: Tunisia
- Born: 13 May 1979 (age 47); Kelibia, Tunisia
- Height: 1.84 m (6 ft 0 in)
- Weight: 74 kg (163 lb)
- Spike: 318 cm (125 in)
- Block: 302 cm (119 in)

Volleyball information
- Number: 15

Career
Years	Teams
2012–	(Tunisia) E.S. Tunis

National team
2012–	Tunisia

Mehdi Ben Cheikh (born 13 May 1979) is a Tunisian male volleyball player. He is part of the Tunisia men's national volleyball team. He competed with the national team at the 2012 Summer Olympics in London, Great Britain. He played with E.S. Tunis in 2012 and competed at the 2014 FIVB Volleyball Men's Club World Championship.

He competed at the 2020 Summer Olympics.

== Clubs ==
- (Tunisia) E.S. Tunis (2012)

== See also ==
- Tunisia at the 2012 Summer Olympics

Olympic Games
Preceded by Oussama Mellouli	Flag bearer for Tunisia; Tokyo 2020 with Inès Boubakri	Succeeded by Samil Jemai; Khadija Krimi
