= Mohamed Ben Sheikh =

Tunisian volleyball player (born 1950)

Personal information
- Nationality: Tunisian
- Born: 7 September 1950 (age 74)

Sport
- Sport: Volleyball

Mohamed Ben Sheikh (born 7 September 1950) is a Tunisian volleyball player. He competed in the men's tournament at the 1972 Summer Olympics.
