= Selim Mbareki =

Tunisian volleyball player (born 1996)

Personal information
- Nationality: Tunisia
- Born: 6 March 1996 (age 29)
- Height: 1.98 m (6 ft 6 in)

Sport
- Sport: Volleyball

Selim Mbareki (born 6 March 1996) is a Tunisian volleyball player. He competed in the 2020 Summer Olympics.
