= Mohamed Sarsar =

Tunisian volleyball player (born 1961)

Personal information
- Nationality: Tunisian
- Born: 25 May 1961 (age 63)

Sport
- Sport: Volleyball

Mohamed Sarsar (born 25 June 1961) is a Tunisian volleyball player. He competed at the 1984 Summer Olympics and the 1988 Summer Olympics. He was part of CS Sfaxien from 1978-1988.
