= DR Congo men's national volleyball team =

National volleyball team

DR Congo
- Confederation: CAVB
- Head coach: Danny Sapalo

Uniforms
Home	Away

African Championship
- Appearances: 6 (First in 1993)
- Best result: 6th (1993, 2003)

The Democratic Republic of the Congo men's national volleyball team represents Democratic Republic of the Congo in international volleyball competitions and friendly matches.

== Results ==
=== African Men's Volleyball Championship ===
- 1993 — 6th place
- 2003 — 6th place
- 2005 — 7th place
- 2017 — 8th place
- 2019 — 8th place
- 2021 — 8th place

=== All-Africa Games ===
- 2007 — 9th place
