= Hichem Ben Romdhane =

Tunisian volleyball player (born 1972)

Personal information
- Nationality: Tunisian
- Born: 25 January 1972 (age 53)

Sport
- Sport: Volleyball

Hichem Ben Romdhane (born 25 January 1972) is a Tunisian volleyball player. He competed in the men's tournament at the 1996 Summer Olympics.
