= Khaled Ben Slimene =

Tunisian volleyball player (born 1994)

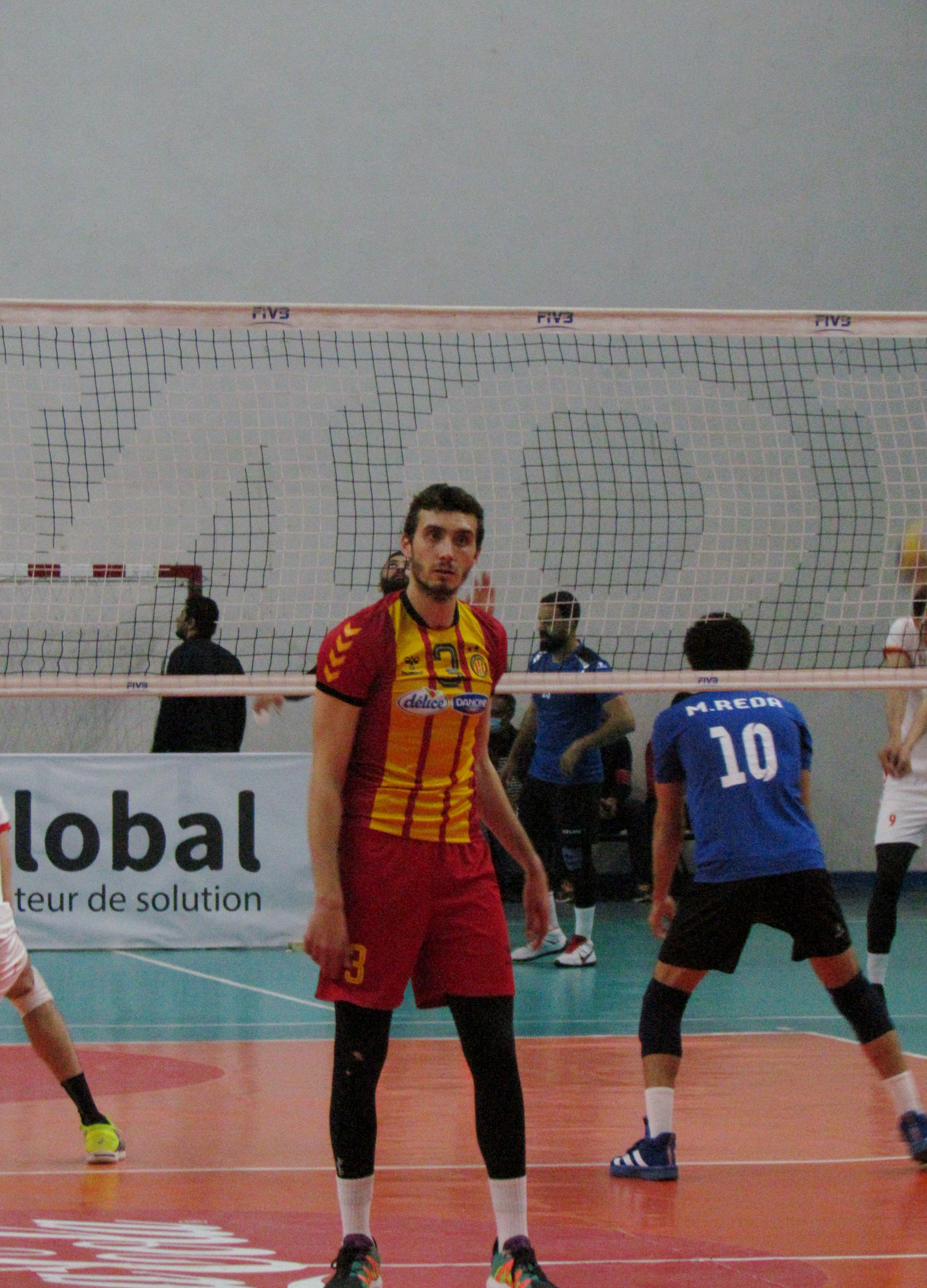
- Ben Slimene in 2021

Personal information
- Nationality: Tunisia
- Born: 14 December 1994 (age 31); Kelibia, Tunisia
- Height: 1.93 m (6 ft 4 in)
- Weight: 78 kg (172 lb)
- Spike: 290 cm (114 in)
- Block: 285 cm (112 in)

Volleyball information
- Number: 16

Career
Years	Teams
2014	(Tunisia) CO Kelibia

National team
2014	Tunisia

Khaled Ben Slimene (born 14 December 1994) is a Tunisian male volleyball player. He was part of the Tunisia men's national volleyball team at the 2014 FIVB Volleyball Men's World Championship in Poland. He played for CO Kelibia.

He competed at the 2020 Summer Olympics.

== Clubs ==
- CO Kelibia (2014)
