= Chokri Jouini =

Tunisian volleyball player (born 1989)

Personal information
- Nationality: Tunisia
- Born: 25 April 1989 (age 37)
- Height: 196 cm (6 ft 5 in)
- Weight: 72 kg (159 lb)
- Spike: 355 cm (140 in)
- Block: 330 cm (130 in)

Volleyball information
- Number: 16

Career
Years	Teams
2014	Esperance Sportive de Tunis

National team
2007	Tunisia

Chokri Jouini (born 25 April 1989) is a Tunisian male volleyball player. With his club Esperance Sportive de Tunis he competed at the 2014 FIVB Volleyball Men's Club World Championship.
