= Ghazi Guidara =

Tunisian volleyball player (born 1974)

Personal information
- Nationality: Tunisia
- Born: 18 May 1974 (age 52)
- Height: 1.86 m (6 ft 1 in)
- Weight: 75 kg (165 lb)
- Spike: 326 cm (128 in)
- Block: 305 cm (120 in)

Volleyball information
- Number: 15

Career
Years	Teams
2004	(Tunisia) E.S. Tunis

National team
2004	Tunisia

Ghazi Guidara (born 18 May 1974 at sfax) is a former Tunisian male volleyball player. He was part of the Tunisia men's national volleyball team. He competed with the national team at the 2004 Summer Olympics in Athens, Greece. He played with E.S. Tunis in 2004.

== Clubs ==
- (Tunisia) E.S. Tunis (2004)

== See also ==
- Tunisia at the 2004 Summer Olympics
