= Hosni Karamosly =

Tunisian volleyball player (born 1980)

Personal information
- Nationality: Tunisia
- Born: 1 June 1980 (age 46)
- Height: 1.97 m (6 ft 6 in)
- Weight: 82 kg (181 lb)
- Spike: 338 cm (133 in)
- Block: 315 cm (124 in)

Volleyball information
- Number: 18

Career
Years	Teams
2004	(Tunisia) CS Sfaxien

National team
2004-2019	Tunisia

Hosni Karamosly (born 1 June 1980) is a former Tunisian male volleyball player. He was part of the Tunisia men's national volleyball team. He competed with the national team at the 2004 Summer Olympics in Athens, Greece. He played with CS Sfaxien in 2004.

== Clubs ==
- (Tunisia) CS Sfaxien (2004)

== See also ==
- Tunisia at the 2004 Summer Olympics
