= Mohamed Ben Slimane =

Tunisian volleyball player (born 1981)

Personal information
- Nationality: Tunisian
- Born: 29 November 1981 (age 43); Tunis, Tunisia

Sport
- Sport: Volleyball

Mohamed Ben Slimane (born 29 November 1981) is a Tunisian volleyball player. He competed in the men's tournament at the 2012 Summer Olympics.
