= Bilel Ben Hassine =

Tunisian volleyball player (born 1983)

Personal information
- Nationality: Tunisia
- Born: 22 June 1983 (age 43)
- Height: 1.95 m (6 ft 5 in)
- Weight: 88 kg (194 lb)
- Spike: 330 cm (130 in)
- Block: 315 cm (124 in)

Volleyball information
- Number: 14

Career
Years	Teams
2012	(Tunisia) CS Sfaxien

National team
2012–	Tunisia

Bilel Ben Hassine (born 22 June 1983) is a Tunisian male volleyball player. He is part of the Tunisia men's national volleyball team. He competed with the national team at the 2012 Summer Olympics in London, Great Britain. He played with CS Sfaxien in 2012.

== Clubs ==
- (Tunisia) CS Sfaxien (2012)

== See also ==
- Tunisia at the 2012 Summer Olympics
