= Ahmed Kadhi =

Tunisian volleyball player (born 1989)

Personal information
- Nationality: Tunisia
- Born: 19 April 1989 (age 37); Kelibia, Tunisia
- Height: 1.99 m (6 ft 6 in)
- Weight: 97 kg (214 lb)
- Spike: 345 cm (136 in)
- Block: 318 cm (125 in)

Career
Teams
	(Tunisia)

National team
(Tunisia)

Ahmed Kadhi (born 19 April 1989) is a Tunisian male volleyball player. As part of the Tunisia men's national volleyball team, he competed at the 2012 Summer Olympics in London, Great Britain. His club in 2012 was C.O. Kelibia. His current club is E.S.Sahel.

He competed at the 2020 Summer Olympics.

== Clubs ==
- (Tunisia) C.O. Kelibia
- (Tunisia) E.S. Sahel

== See also ==
- Tunisia at the 2012 Summer Olympics
