= Elyes Garfi =

Tunisian volleyball player (born 1993)

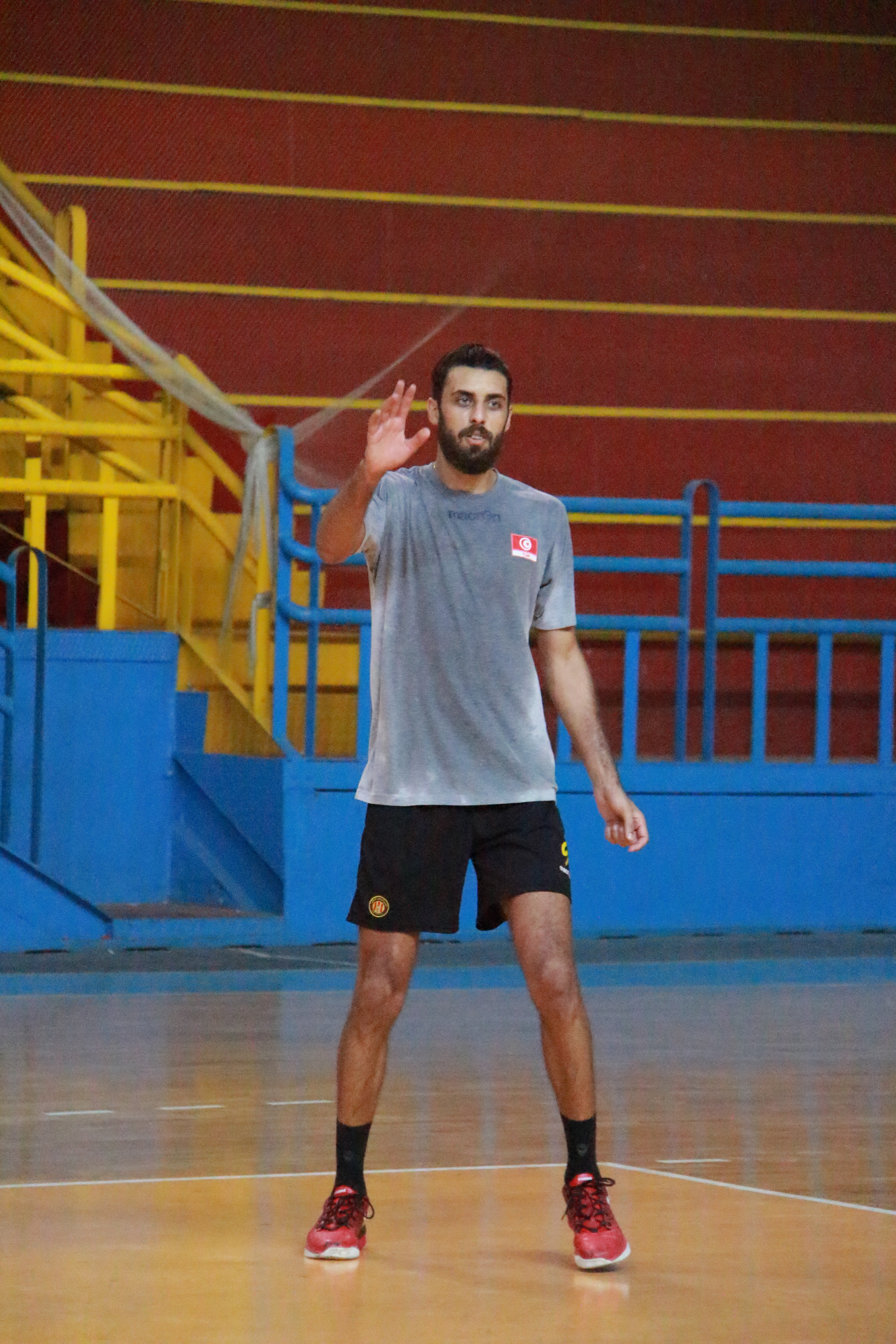
- Garfi in 2017

Personal information
- Nationality: Tunisia
- Born: 8 June 1993 (age 33)
- Height: 202 cm (6 ft 8 in)
- Weight: 90 kg (198 lb)
- Spike: 350 cm (138 in)
- Block: 340 cm (134 in)

Volleyball information
- Number: 9

Career
| Years | Teams |
|---|---|
| 2014 | Esperance Sportive de Tunis |

Elyes Garfi (born 8 June 1993) is a Tunisian male volleyball player. With his club Esperance Sportive de Tunis, he competed at the 2014 FIVB Volleyball Men's Club World Championship.
