= Ismaïl Moalla =

Tunisian volleyball player (born 1990)

Personal information
- Nationality: Tunisia
- Born: 30 January 1990 (age 36); Sfax, Tunisia
- Height: 1.95 m (6 ft 5 in)
- Weight: 67 kg (148 lb)
- Spike: 324 cm (128 in)
- Block: 308 cm (121 in)

Volleyball information
- Number: 11

Career
Years	Teams
2012	(Tunisia) CS Sfaxien

National team
2012–	Tunisia

Ismaïl Moalla (born 30 January 1990 in Sfax) is a Tunisian male volleyball player. He is part of the Tunisia men's national volleyball team. He competed with the national team at the 2012 Summer Olympics in London, Great Britain. He played with CS Sfaxien in 2012.

== Clubs ==
- (Tunisia) CS Sfaxien (2012)
- Shahrdari Arak(Iran)2017-18

== See also ==
- Tunisia at the 2012 Summer Olympics
