= Marouane M'rabet =

Tunisian volleyball player (born 1985)

Personal information
- Nationality: Tunisian
- Born: 5 June 1985 (age 40); Kebili, Tunisia

Sport
- Sport: Volleyball

Marouane M'rabet (born 5 June 1985) is a Tunisian volleyball player. He competed in the men's tournament at the 2012 Summer Olympics.
