= Tunisian Volleyball Federation =

Governing body of volleyball in Tunisia

- Sport: Volleyball; Beach volleyball
- Jurisdiction: Tunisia
- Abbreviation: FTVB
- Founded: 1956
- Affiliation: FIVB
- Affiliation date: 1956
- Regional affiliation: CAVB
- Headquarters: Tunis
- Location: Tunisia
- President: (Tunisia) Abdelmajid Jrad

Official website
- www.ftvb.org
- (Tunisia)

The Tunisian Volleyball Federation (French: Fédération tunisienne de volley-ball) (FTVB) (Arabic: الجامعة التونسية للكرة الطائرة), is the governing body for Volleyball in Tunisia since 1956. The federation is a member of the Arab Volleyball Association, Mediterranean volleyball Confederation, African Volleyball Confederation (CAVB) and the International Volleyball Federation (FIVB). The president of FTVB is Abdelmajid Jrad.

== History ==
The Tunisian Federation has been recognised by FIVB from 1956 and is a member of the African Volleyball Confederation.

== Presidents ==
| President | From | To |
|---|---|---|
| (Tunisia) Mohammed Ben Sliman | 1956 | 1956 |
| (Tunisia) Zine El Abidine Doagi | 1957 | 1965 |
| (Tunisia) Ahmed Belkhouja | 1966 | 1970 |
| (Tunisia) Noureddine Skandrani | 1971 | 1978 |
| (Tunisia) Adel Boussarsar | 1979 | 1980 |
| (Tunisia) Chedly Zouiten | 1981 | 1988 |
| (Tunisia) Béchir Kdous | 1989 | 1994 |
| (Tunisia) Mohammed Ali Farah | 1997 | 1998 |
| (Tunisia) Béchir Louzir | 1998 | 2006 |
| (Tunisia) Slim Ben Youssef | 2006 | 2009 |
| (Tunisia) Mounir Ben Slimene | 2009 | 2016 |
| (Tunisia) Firas El Faleh | 2016 | 2021 |
| (Tunisia) Mohsen Ben taleb | 2021 | 2023 |
| (Tunisia) Mounir Ben Slimene | 2023 | 2024 |
| (Tunisia) Abdelmajid Jrad | 2024 | 2028 |

== Honours ==
=== National Team (Men's senior) ===
- Summer Olympics

Appearances : (7) times
Best result : Nine (1) : 1984

- World Championship

Appearances : (11) times
Best result : Fifteen (1) : 2006

- World Cup

Appearances : (9) times
Best result : Eight (2) : 1981, 1991

- World League

Appearances : (4) times
Best result : Twenty Seven (1) : 2014

- Challenger Cup

Appearances : (2) times
Best result : Six (1) : 2022

- African Championship (Record)

Champions (gold) (11) : 1967, 1971, 1979, 1987, 1995, 1997, 1999, 2003, 2017, 2019, 2021
Runner-up (silver) (7) : 1976, 1983, 1993, 2005, 2007, 2013, 2015
Third place (bronze) (2) : 1991, 2011

- African Games

Champions (gold) (1) : 1978
Runner-up (silver) (3) : 1965, 1973, 2007
Third place (bronze) (1) : 1991

- Mediterranean Games

Runner-up (2) : 2001, 2013

- Arab Championship (Record)

Champions (gold) (8) : 1980, 1984, 1988, 1996, 2000, 2002, 2006, 2012
Runner-up (silver) (2) : 1998, 2008
Third place (bronze) (1) : 1994

- Pan Arab Games (Record)

Champions (gold) (3) : 1957, 1985, 1999
Third place (bronze) (1) : 2004

- Afro-Arab Friendship Cup

Champions (gold) (1) : 1981

- Maghreb Championship (Record)

Champions (gold) (7) : 1967, 1968, 1969, 1970, 1971, 1972, 1973

=== National Team (Women's senior) ===
- Summer Olympics

did not qualify

- World Championship

Sixteen (1) : 1986

- World Cup

Eight (1) : 1985

- African Championship

Champions (gold) (3) : 1985, 1987, 1999
Runner-up (silver) (2) : 1976, 2009
Third place (bronze) (3) : 1995, 2007, 2013

- African Games

did not qualify

- Mediterranean Games

Eight (1) : 2001

- Arab Championship

Champions (gold) (2) : 1980, 1989

- Pan Arab Games

Runner-up (silver) (3) : 1985, 1992, 1999

=== National team (Men's U23) ===
- U23 World Championship

Eight (1): 2013

- U23 African Championship

Champions (gold) (1) : 2014

=== National Junior team (Boys U21) ===
- U21 World Championship

Five (1): 1993

- U21 African Championship (Record)

Champions (gold) (11) : 1984, 1990, 1992, 1996, 1998, 2000, 2008, 2010, 2013, 2018, 2024
Runner-up (silver) (5): 1994, 2002, 2004, 2006, 2022
Third place (bronze) (1): 1986

=== National Youth team (Boys U19) ===
- Youth Olympic Games

did not qualify

- U19 World Championship

Six (1): 2009

- African Championship U19 (Record)

Champions (gold) (9): 1994, 1997, 1998, 2000, 2006, 2008, 2010, 2016, 2024
Runner-up (silver) (4): 2002, 2004, 2013, 2015

- Arab Youth Championship

Champions (gold) (4): 1992, 1994, 1996, 2009
Runner-up (silver) (2) : 2011, 2013
Third place (bronze) (1): 1998

=== National Girls team (U23) ===
- Women's U23 World Championship

did not qualify

- Women's U23 African Championship

Runner-up (silver) (1) : 2014

=== National Junior team (Girls) ===
- Women's U20 World Championship

Thirteen (1): 1995

- Women's Africa Championship U20

Champions (gold) 2024
Runner-up (silver) (3) : 2006, 2010, 2017
Third place (bronze) (2): 2002, 2006

=== National Youth team (Girls) ===
- Youth Olympic Games

did not qualify

- Girls' U18 World Championship

Thirteen (1): 2005

- Girls' Africa Championship U18

Champions (gold) (4): 2006, 2008, 2010, 2024
Runner-up (silver) (3) : 2004, 2013, 2014
Third place (bronze) (1): 2011

== See also ==
- Tunisia men's national volleyball team
- Tunisia women's national volleyball team
- Tunisia men's national under-23 volleyball team
- Tunisia men's national under-21 volleyball team
- Tunisia men's national under-19 volleyball team
- Tunisia women's national under-23 volleyball team
- Tunisia women's national under-20 volleyball team
- Tunisia women's national under-18 volleyball team
- Tunisian Men's Volleyball League
- Tunisian Volleyball Cup
