= South Africa men's national volleyball team =

National sports team

South Africa
- Association: Volleyball South Africa
- Confederation: CAVB
- FIVB ranking: NR (5 October 2025)

Uniforms
| Home | Away | Third |

The South Africa men's national volleyball team represents South Africa in international volleyball competitions and friendly matches. The team has competed in the biennial African Men's Volleyball Championship eight times since 1993. Currently, the team is in joint last (ninth) position on the medals table of the previously mentioned championship along with Guinea, having won only one bronze medal in 2001.

== History ==
After first entering the African Volleyball Championship in 1993, South Africa finished in 8th place out of 10 teams. After missing the 1995 championship, the team returned in 1997, finishing 7th out of 8. South Africa competed again in 2001, this time finishing 3rd out of only 5 teams. South Africa therefore qualified for the 2002 FIVB Volleyball Men's World Championship qualification but they later withdrew.

In the next five championships, South Africa finished 7th out of 8 teams in 2003; 8th out of 10 teams in 2005; 4th out of 9 teams in 2007; 7th out of 9 teams in 2009; and 7th out of 8 teams in 2011.

The South Africa men's national volleyball team have not competed in the African Volleyball Championship since 2011. They have not competed in any worldwide tournaments or events since their founding.

=== African Championship ===
Champions Runners up Third place Fourth place

African Championship record
| Year | Round | Position | GP | W | L | SW | SL |
|---|---|---|---|---|---|---|---|
| (Tunisia) 1967 | Didn't Compete | | | | | | |
| (Egypt) 1971 | Didn't Compete | | | | | | |
| (Tunisia) 1976 | Didn't Compete | | | | | | |
| (Libya) 1979 | Didn't Compete | | | | | | |
| (Egypt) 1983 | Didn't Compete | | | | | | |
| (Tunisia) 1987 | Didn't Compete | | | | | | |
| (Ivory Coast) 1989 | Didn't Compete | | | | | | |
| (Egypt) 1991 | Didn't Compete | | | | | | |
| (Algeria) 1993 | | 8th | | | | | |
| (Tunisia) 1995 | Didn't Compete | | | | | | |
| (Nigeria) 1997 | | 7th | | | | | |
| (Egypt) 1999 | Didn't Compete | | | | | | |
| (Nigeria) 2001 | | 3rd | | | | | |
| (Egypt) 2003 | | 7th | | | | | |
| (Egypt) 2005 | | 8th | | | | | |
| (South Africa) 2007 | | 4th | | | | | |
| (Morocco) 2009 | | 7th | | | | | |
| (Morocco) 2011 | | 7th | | | | | |
| (Tunisia) 2013 | Didn't Compete | | | | | | |
| (Egypt) 2015 | Didn't Compete | | | | | | |
| (Egypt) 2017 | Didn't Compete | | | | | | |
| Total | 8/21 | 0 Titles | – | – | – | – | ---- |

=== African Games ===
Champions Runners up Third place Fourth place

African Games record
| Year | Round | Position | GP | W | L | SW | SL |
|---|---|---|---|---|---|---|---|
| (Republic of the Congo) 1965 | Didn't Compete | | | | | | |
| (Nigeria) 1973 | Didn't Compete | | | | | | |
| (Algeria) 1978 | Didn't Compete | | | | | | |
| (Kenya) 1987 | Didn't Compete | | | | | | |
| (Egypt) 1991 | Didn't Compete | | | | | | |
| (Zimbabwe) 1995 | | 5/6th | | | | | |
| (South Africa) 1999 | | 4th | | | | | |
| (Nigeria) 2003 | | 5th | | | | | |
| (Algeria) 2007 | | 6th | | | | | |
| (Mozambique) 2011 | | 7th | | | | | |
| (Republic of the Congo) 2015 | Didn't Compete | | | | | | |
| Total | 5/11 | 0 Titles | | | | | |
