= Men's African Nations Volleyball Championship =

Official competition for senior men's national volleyball teams of Africa

- Most recent season or competition: 2026 Men's African Nations Volleyball Championship
- Sport: Volleyball
- Founded: 1967; 59 years ago
- First season: 1967
- No. of teams: 16 (Finals)
- Continent: CAVB (Africa)
- Most recent champions: Tunisia (12th title)
- Most titles: Tunisia (12 titles)

The African Men's Volleyball Championship is the official competition for senior men's national volleyball teams of Africa, organized by the African Volleyball Confederation (CAVB). The initial gap between championships was variable, but since 1987 they have been held biannually. The current champion are Tunisia, which won its twelfth title at the 2026 tournament on home soil.

== Summary ==
Year	Host	Final			3rd place match			Teams
Year	Host	Champions	Score	Runners-up	3rd place	Score	4th place	Teams
1967	(Tunisia) Tunis	Tunisia	3–0	Algeria	Guinea	3–0	Libya	4
1971	(Egypt) Cairo	Tunisia	3–2	Egypt	Madagascar		Cameroon	7
1976	(Tunisia) Tunis	Egypt		Tunisia	Morocco		Senegal	8
1979	(Libya) Tripoli	Tunisia		Libya	Madagascar		Senegal	5
1983	(Egypt) Port Said	Egypt		Tunisia	Algeria	Round-robin	Cameroon	7
1987	(Tunisia) Tunis	Tunisia	3–0	Cameroon	Algeria	3–2	Egypt	8
1989	(Ivory Coast) Abidjan	Cameroon	3–2	Algeria	Egypt	3–0	Ivory Coast	4
1991	(Egypt) Cairo	Algeria	3–2	Egypt	Tunisia	3–0	Cameroon	10
1993	(Algeria) Algiers	Algeria	3–0	Tunisia	Egypt	3–0	Seychelles	10
1995	(Tunisia) Tunis	Tunisia	Round-robin	Egypt	Algeria	Round-robin	Morocco	6
1997	(Nigeria) Lagos	Tunisia	3–0	Cameroon	Algeria	3–1	Nigeria	8
1999	(Egypt) Cairo	Tunisia	Round-robin	Egypt	Algeria	Round-robin	Cameroon	6
2001	(Nigeria) Port Harcourt	Cameroon	3–1	Nigeria	South Africa	Round-robin	Mauritius	5
2003	(Egypt) Cairo	Tunisia	3–0	Egypt	Cameroon	3–0	Algeria	8
2005	(Egypt) Cairo	Egypt	3–1	Tunisia	Cameroon	3–0	Morocco	10
2007	(South Africa) Durban	Egypt	3–2	Tunisia	Cameroon	3–0	South Africa	9
2009	(Morocco) Tétouan	Egypt	3–0	Algeria	Cameroon	3–1	Morocco	9
2011	(Morocco) Tangier	Egypt	3–1	Cameroon	Tunisia	3–1	Algeria	8
2013	(Tunisia) Sousse	Egypt	Round-robin	Tunisia	Morocco	Round-robin	Cameroon	6
2015	(Egypt) Cairo	Egypt	3–0	Tunisia	Morocco	3–1	Algeria	9
2017	(Egypt) Cairo	Tunisia	3–0	Egypt	Cameroon	3–1	Algeria	14
2019	(Tunisia) Tunis	Tunisia	3–2	Cameroon	Algeria	3–1	Egypt	10
2021	(Rwanda) Kigali	Tunisia	3–1	Cameroon	Egypt	3–1	Morocco	16
2023	(Egypt) Cairo	Egypt	3–1	Algeria	Libya	3–1	Cameroon	15
2026	(Tunisia) Tunis	Tunisia	3–0	Cameroon	Algeria	3–0	Morocco	13

== Medal summary ==
Rank	Nation	Gold	Silver	Bronze	Total
1	Tunisia	12	7	2	21
2	Egypt	9	6	3	18
3	Cameroon	2	6	5	13
4	Algeria	2	4	7	13
5	Libya	0	1	1	2
6	Nigeria	0	1	0	1
7	Morocco	0	0	3	3
8	Madagascar	0	0	2	2
9	Guinea	0	0	1	1
9	South Africa	0	0	1	1
Totals (10 entries)		25	25	25	75

== Participating nations ==
Nation	(Tunisia) 1967	(Egypt) 1971	(Tunisia) 1976	(Libya) 1979	(Egypt) 1983	(Tunisia) 1987	(Ivory Coast) 1989	(Egypt) 1991	(Algeria) 1993	(Tunisia) 1995	(Nigeria) 1997	(Egypt) 1999	(Nigeria) 2001	(Egypt) 2003	(Egypt) 2005	(South Africa) 2007	(Morocco) 2009	(Morocco) 2011	(Tunisia) 2013	(Egypt) 2015	(Egypt) 2017	(Tunisia) 2019	(Rwanda) 2021	(Egypt) 2023	(Tunisia) 2026	Years
Algeria	2nd				3rd	3rd	2nd	1st	1st	3rd	3rd	3rd		4th			2nd	4th	5th	4th	4th	3rd		2nd	3rd	18
Angola					6th			10th																		2
Botswana									10th		8th				9th	7th	8th	8th		7th	11th	10th				9
Burkina Faso																							13th			1
Burundi																						9th	11th	14th		3
Cameroon		4th			4th	2nd	1st	4th		5th	2nd	4th	1st	3rd	3rd	3rd	3rd	2nd	4th	5th	3rd	2nd	2nd	4th	2nd	21
Chad																					12th	7th		7th	11th	3
Central African Republic																									13th	1
Congo			8th															5th				6th				3
DR Congo									6th					6th	7th						8th	8th	8th		10th	7
Egypt		2nd	1st		1st	4th	3rd	2nd	3rd	2nd	5th	2nd		2nd	1st	1st	1st	1st	1st	1st	2nd	4th	3rd	1st	5th	22
Ethiopia																							15th			1
Gabon																	9th									1
Gambia																								12th	12th	2
Ghana								6th				6th									9th			10th	7th	5
Guinea	3rd																									1
Ivory Coast		6th	6th				4th	9th	9th																	5
Kenya						8th		7th	7th	6th						5th				8th	10th		9th	9th	9th	10
Libya	4th			2nd													6th		6th		7th			3rd		6
Madagascar		3rd	5th	3rd																						3
Mali																							10th	15th		2
Mauritius													4th							9th						2
Morocco			3rd						5th	4th		5th		5th	4th		4th	6th	3rd	3rd	5th	5th	4th	8th	4th	15
Mozambique																9th										1
Niger																					14th		12th			2
Nigeria				5th		5th		5th			4th		2nd		6th						13th		7th		8th	9
Rwanda						7th								8th	5th	6th				6th	6th		6th	6th	6th	9
Senegal		5th	4th	4th							6th													11th		5
Seychelles									4th																	1
South Africa									8th		7th		3rd	7th	8th	4th	7th	7th								8
South Sudan																							14th			1
Sudan					5th	6th							5th		10th											4
Tanzania																							16th	13th		2
Togo		7th																								1
Tunisia	1st	1st	2nd	1st	2nd	1st		3rd	2nd	1st	1st	1st		1st	2nd	2nd	5th	3rd	2nd	2nd	1st	1st	1st	5th	1st	23
Uganda																							5th			1
Zambia								8th																		1
Zimbabwe					7th											8th										2
Total	4	7	7	5	7	8	4	10	10	6	8	6	5	8	10	9	9	8	6	9	14	10	16	15	13	

== See also ==
- Women's African Volleyball Championship
- Volleyball at the African Games
- Men's U23 African Volleyball Championship
- African Volleyball Championship U21
- African Volleyball Championship U19
