= Ahmed Salah (volleyball) =

Egyptian volleyball player (born 1984)

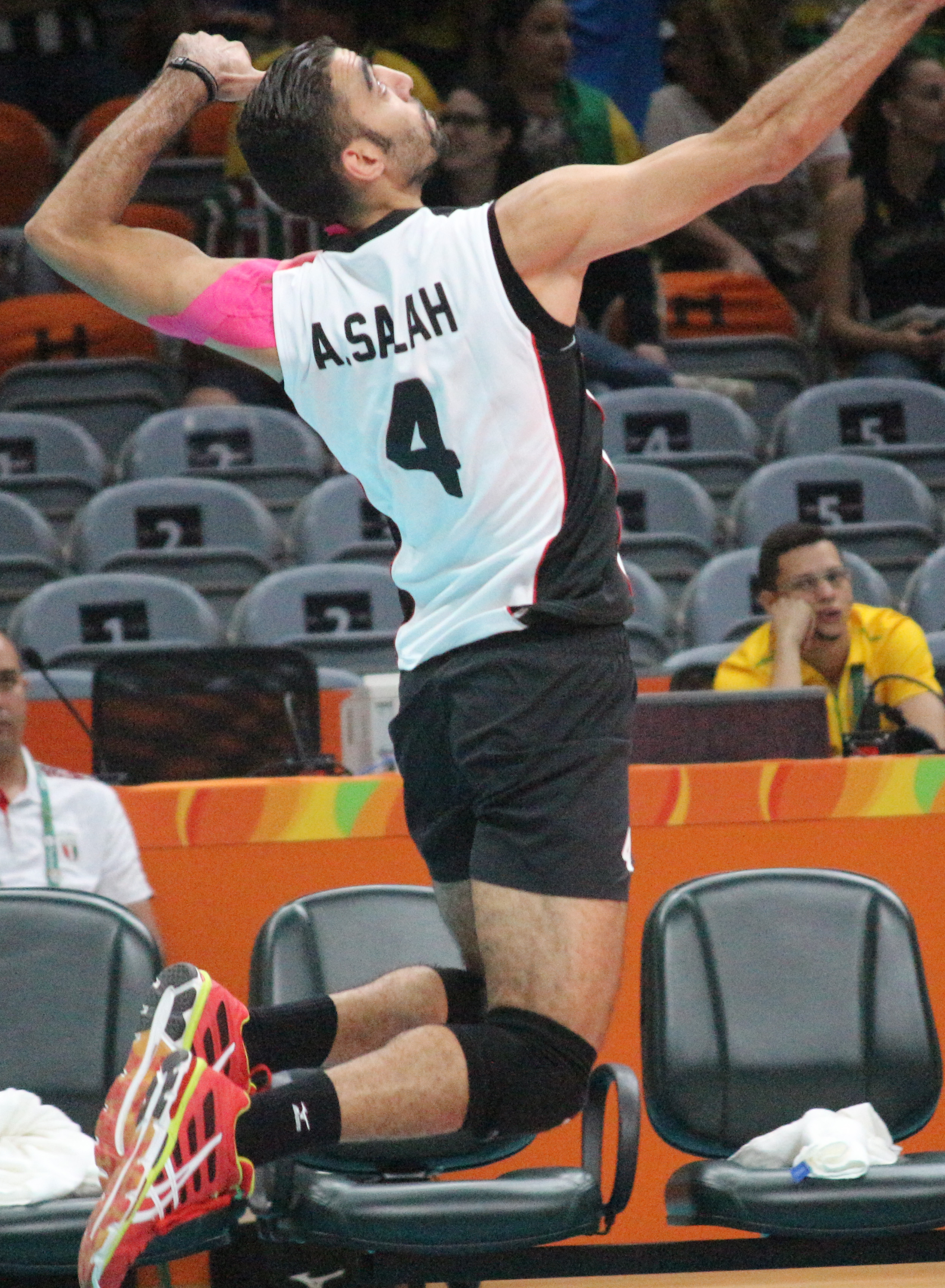
- Salah at the 2016 Olympics

Personal information
- Full name: Ahmed Abdelhey Salah El din
- Nationality: Egyptian
- Born: 19 August 1984 (age 42); Egypt
- Height: 1.97 m (6 ft 6 in)
- Weight: 87 kg (192 lb)
- Spike: 342 cm (135 in)
- Block: 316 cm (124 in)

Volleyball information
- Position: Opposite Spiker
- Current team: Al Ahly (volleyball)
- Number: 4

Career
Years	Teams
2001-2009	(Egypt) Al Ahly SC
2010–2011	(Russia) Dynamo Yanter
2010–2012	(Egypt) Al Ahly SC
2012–2013	(Turkey) Halkbank Ankara
2013–2014	(Turkey) Galatsaray
2014–2018	(Egypt) AL GAISH
2018-present	(Egypt) Al Ahly SC

National team
2003–Now	Egypt
Honours
Men's volleyball
Representing Egypt
African Championship
Gold medal – first place	2005 Egypt
Gold medal – first place	2007 South Africa
Gold medal – first place	2009 Morocco
Gold medal – first place	2011 Morocco
Gold medal – first place	2013 Tunisia
Gold medal – first place	2015 Egypt
Silver medal – second place	2017 Egypt
Mediterranean Games
Gold medal – first place	2005 Almería
- Last updated: 10 June 2018

Ahmed Salah (born 19 August 1984), also known as Ahmed Abdel Naeim (Arabic: احمد صلاح), is an Egyptian indoor volleyball player. Since 2003 he is a member of the Egypt men's national volleyball team, where he goes by the nickname Salah. He competed at the 2008 and 2016 Summer Olympics and 2006, 2010 and 2014 World Championships.

Abdelhay was named most valuable player (MVP) at the 2011 and 2015 and best server at the 2011 and 2013 African Championships; he was also voted as best spiker at the 2011 World Cup. He is a patriot and refused several offers to change nationality despite the financial privileges. He retired internationally in 2023 after winning his 7th African championship in Cairo.

== Honours ==
=== Club ===
Al Ahly SC (Egypt)

- Egyptian Volleyball League (12): 2001/02, 2002/03, 2003/04, 2005/06, 2006/07, 2008/09, 2009/10, 2010/11, 2018/19, 2019/20, 2020/2021, 2023/24
- Egyptian Volleyball Cup (12) : 2001/02, 2002/03, 2003/04, 2004/05, 2005/06, 2006/07, 2007/08, 2009/10, 2010/11, 2018/19, 2019/2020, 2023/24.
- African Clubs Championship (8): 2003, 2004, 2006, 2010, 2011, 2019, 2022, 2024
- Arab Clubs Championship (6): 2002, 2005, 2006, 2010, 2020, 2023 .
- Egyptian Volleyball Super Cup (2)

 2023, 2024

Halkbank Ankara (Turkey)

- CEV Cup (1): 2012–13
- Turkish Volleyball Cup (1) : 2013–14

Al Gaish (Egypt)

- Egyptian Volleyball League (2): 2015/16, 2016/2017.
- Egyptian Volleyball Cup (2): 2014/15, 2016/17.
- African Clubs Championship : 2016

Al Hilal (Saudi Arabia)

- Arab Clubs Championship: 2011

=== International ===
- Men's African Volleyball Championship (7): 2005, 2007, 2009, 2011, 2013, 2015, 2023
- Mediterranean Games : 2005
- Volleyball at the African Games : 2003, 2007
- 3 × Arab Games : 2006, 2014, 2016

=== Individual ===
- FIVB Volleyball Men's World Cup Best Spiker (1): 2011
- FIVB Volleyball Men's World Cup Top Scorer (1): 2015
- Men's African Volleyball Championship MVP (1): 2005, 2009, 2011
- Men's African Volleyball Championship Best Server (2): 2007, 2011
- Men's African Volleyball Championship Best Spiker (1): 2007
- Olympic Continental Qualification Tournament (Africa) MVP (1): 2008
- Olympic Continental Qualification Tournament (Africa) Best Spiker (1): 2008
- African Clubs Championship MVP (2): 2009, 2010
- African Clubs Championship Best Spiker (1): 2015
- Arab Clubs Championship MVP: 2006, 2011
- Arab Clubs Championship Best Server: 2005, 2010
- Arab Clubs Championship Best Spiker: 2006
- Egyptian League MVP: 2007
- Egyptian League Best Server: 2001
- Egyptian League Best Spiker: 2001, 2002, 2004, 2005, 2007
- best player & best attacker (in African cup for youth 2002)
- best server (8th rashid international volleyball tournament 2004)
