= 2018 FIVB Men's Volleyball World Championship qualification (CAVB) =

Volleyball tournament qualification

The CAVB qualification for the 2018 FIVB Men's Volleyball World Championship saw member nations compete for three places at the finals in Italy and Bulgaria.

CAVB Board of Administration meeting of 25 May 2017 decided to merge the 2017 Men's African Volleyball Championship and 2018 FIVB World Championship Continental Qualifiers. The top three teams from amongst the teams, who had registered with FIVB for the 2018 World Championship, qualified to represent Africa in the 2018 World Championship.

== Pools composition ==
32 CAVB national teams entered the qualification. But, Burundi, Central African Republic, Gabon, Gambia, Lesotho, Malawi, Namibia, Senegal, Sudan, Tanzania, Zimbabwe, Seychelles, Mauritius and Madagascar later withdrew.

=== First round ===
There were seven confederation zonal competitions. The teams were distributed according to their geographical positions. The winners of each competition competed in second round.

- Egypt qualified to second round as host country in 2017 Men's African Volleyball Championship.
- Tunisia, Cameroon and Algeria qualified to second round as top three FIVB ranking teams. Ranking as per 7 July 2017 are shown in brackets.

Rank	Team
1	Tunisia (24)
2	Cameroon (30)
3	Algeria (41)

Berths for second round

Zone	Total
Pool A	1
Pool B	2
Pool C	2
Pool D	2
Pool E	2
Pool F	2
Pool G	1

Pool A	Pool B	Pool C	Pool D	Pool E	Pool F	Pool G
Tunisia	Cape Verde	Niger	Cameroon	Egypt	Botswana	~~Seychelles~~
Algeria	~~Senegal~~	Ivory Coast	Congo	Kenya	Mozambique	~~Mauritius~~
Morocco	~~Gambia~~	Nigeria	DR Congo	Rwanda	Eswatini	~~Madagascar~~
Libya		Ghana	~~Central African~~	South Sudan	~~Lesotho~~	
			~~Gabon~~	Uganda	~~Malawi~~	
				~~Burundi~~	~~Namibia~~	
				~~Sudan~~	~~Zimbabwe~~	
				~~Tanzania~~		

=== Second round ===
The second round was 2017 African Championship which acted also as a qualifier for the 2018 World Championship. The top three teams from World ranking as of 7 July 2017 and the host directly qualified from first round. If the top three ranking teams have already qualified, the next best team from their pool would replace them in this round.

== Pool standing procedure ==
1. Number of matches won
2. Match points
3. Sets ratio
4. Points ratio
5. If the tie continues as per the point ratio between two teams, the priority will be given to the team which won the last match between them. When the tie in points ratio is between three or more teams, a new classification of these teams in the terms of points 1, 2 and 3 will be made taking into consideration only the matches in which they were opposed to each other.

Match won 3–0 or 3–1: 3 match points for the winner, 0 match points for the loser
Match won 3–2: 2 match points for the winner, 1 match point for the loser

== First round ==
=== Pool A ===
- Venue: Tunis, Tunisia
- Dates: 21–23 September 2017

Pos	Team	Pld	W	L	Pts	SW	SL	SR	SPW	SPL	SPR	Qualification
1	Morocco	2	2	0	5	6	3	2.000	201	194	1.036	2017 African Championship
2	Algeria	2	1	1	4	5	4	1.250	200	191	1.047	
3	Libya	2	0	2	0	2	6	0.333	176	192	0.917	

Date	Time		Score		Set 1	Set 2	Set 3	Set 4	Set 5	Total	Report
21 Sep	18:00	Algeria	3–1	Libya	25–20	19–25	25–22	25–21		94–88	Result
22 Sep	18:00	Morocco	3–1	Libya	23–25	25–21	25–21	25–21		98–88	Result
23 Sep	18:00	Algeria	2–3	Morocco	20–25	25–15	25–21	21–25	15–17	106–103	Result

=== Pool B ===
- Cape Verde qualified for the 2017 African Championship. Gambia and Senegal withdrew from qualification.

Rank	Team	Qualification
1	Cape Verde	2017 African Championship

=== Pool C ===
- Venue: Niamey, Niger
- Dates: 8–10 July 2017

Pos	Team	Pld	W	L	Pts	SW	SL	SR	SPW	SPL	SPR	Qualification
1	Ghana	3	3	0	9	9	2	4.500	268	210	1.276	2017 African Championship
2	Nigeria	3	2	1	6	7	3	2.333	224	218	1.028	2017 African Championship
3	Niger	3	1	2	3	4	7	0.571	240	246	0.976	2017 African Championship
4	Ivory Coast	3	0	3	0	1	9	0.111	185	243	0.761	

Date	Time		Score		Set 1	Set 2	Set 3	Set 4	Set 5	Total	Report
8 Jul	17:00	Niger	3–1	Ivory Coast	25–17	25–16	17–25	25–17		92–75	Result
8 Jul	19:00	Ghana	3–1	Nigeria	22–25	25–16	25–19	25–13		97–73	Result
9 Jul	16:30	Nigeria	3–0	Niger	25–21	25–22	25–22			75–65	Result
9 Jul	18:30	Ghana	3–0	Ivory Coast	25–17	25–21	25–16			75–54	Result
10 Jul	14:00	Nigeria	3–0	Ivory Coast	26–24	25–17	25–15			76–56	Result
10 Jul	16:00	Niger	1–3	Ghana	19–25	22–25	25–21	17–25		83–96	Result

=== Pool D ===
- Venue: Stade des Martyrs, Kinshasa, DR Congo
- Dates: 20*–21 May 2017

Pos	Team	Pld	W	L	Pts	SW	SL	SR	SPW	SPL	SPR	Qualification
1	DR Congo	1	1	0	3	3	0	MAX	75	62	1.210	2017 African Championship
2	Congo	1	0	1	0	0	3	0.000	62	75	0.827	2017 African Championship

Date	Time		Score		Set 1	Set 2	Set 3	Set 4	Set 5	Total	Report
21 May		DR Congo	3–0	Congo	25–23	25–21	25–18			75–62	Result

* Match on 20 May 2017 (Congo lead DR Congo 2–1: –, 25–22, 26–24) was abandoned due to insufficient light, and replayed the following day.

=== Pool E ===
- Venue: Amahoro Indoor Stadium, Kigali, Rwanda
- Dates: 22–24 July 2017

Pos	Team	Pld	W	L	Pts	SW	SL	SR	SPW	SPL	SPR	Qualification
1	Kenya	3	2	1	7	8	4	2.000	281	243	1.156	2017 African Championship
2	Rwanda	3	2	1	6	7	4	1.750	260	233	1.116	2017 African Championship
3	Uganda	3	2	1	5	7	5	1.400	268	253	1.059	
4	South Sudan	3	0	3	0	0	9	0.000	145	225	0.644	

Date	Time		Score		Set 1	Set 2	Set 3	Set 4	Set 5	Total	Report
22 Jul	16:00	Uganda	3–2	Kenya	26–24	25–21	17–25	24–26	15–12	107–108	Result
22 Jul	19:00	Rwanda	3–0	South Sudan	25–19	25–14	25–16			75–49	Result
23 Jul	16:00	Rwanda	3–1	Uganda	25–23	25–17	19–25	25–21		94–86	Result
23 Jul	18:00	Kenya	3–0	South Sudan	25–17	25–10	25–18			75–45	Result
24 Jul	16:00	South Sudan	0–3	Uganda	13–25	18–25	20–25			51–75	Result
24 Jul	18:00	Rwanda	1–3	Kenya	23–25	22–25	25–23	21–25		91–98	Result

=== Pool F ===
- Venue: Politecnica Hall, Maputo, Mozambique
- Dates: 30 June – 2 July 2017

Pos	Team	Pld	W	L	Pts	SW	SL	SR	SPW	SPL	SPR	Qualification
1	Mozambique	2	2	0	5	6	2	3.000	201	184	1.092	2017 African Championship
2	Botswana	2	1	1	4	5	3	1.667	175	173	1.012	2017 African Championship
3	Eswatini	2	0	2	0	0	6	0.000	148	167	0.886	

Date	Time		Score		Set 1	Set 2	Set 3	Set 4	Set 5	Total	Report
30 Jun	17:00	Botswana	3–0	Eswatini	25–23	25–21	25–20			75–64	Result
1 Jul	17:00	Mozambique	3–0	Eswatini	25–21	31–29	36–34			92–84	Result
2 Jul	17:00	Mozambique	3–2	Botswana	25–21	25–20	22–25	22–25	15–9	109–100	Result

- Mozambique qualified for the 2017 African Championship as the winners of zone but later withdrew.

=== Pool G ===
- Seychelles, Mauritius and Madagascar withdrew from qualification.

== 2017 African Championship ==
- Venues: Cairo Stadium Indoor Hall 2, Cairo, Egypt and Cairo Stadium Indoor Hall 3, Cairo, Egypt
- Dates: 22–29 October 2017
- The top three teams qualified for the 2018 World Championship.

Rank	Team
1st place, gold medalist(s)	Tunisia
2nd place, silver medalist(s)	Egypt
3rd place, bronze medalist(s)	Cameroon
4	Algeria
5	Morocco
6	Rwanda
7	Libya
8	DR Congo
9	Ghana
10	Kenya
11	Botswana
12	Chad
13	Nigeria
14	Niger

Qualified for the 2018 World Championship
