= Volleyball at the 2011 All-Africa Games – Men's tournament =

The Men's tournament of the volleyball competition of the 2011 All-Africa Games was held from September 6–16, 2011 in Maputo.

== Teams ==
- Algeria
- Cameroon
- Kenya
- Mozambique
- Nigeria
- Rwanda
- Seychelles
- South Africa

== Preliminary round ==
=== Group A ===
Pos	Team	Pld	W	L	Pts	SW	SL	SR	SPW	SPL	SPR	Qualification
1	Cameroon	3	3	0	9	9	1	9.000	244	191	1.277	Semifinals
2	Rwanda	3	2	1	6	7	4	1.750	262	216	1.213	Semifinals
3	Seychelles	3	1	2	3	4	6	0.667	207	228	0.908	5th–8th place
4	Mozambique	3	0	3	0	0	9	0.000	147	225	0.653	5th–8th place

Date		Score		Set 1	Set 2	Set 3	Set 4	Set 5	Total
2 Sep	Cameroon	3–1	Rwanda	25–20	19–25	25–20	25–18		94–83
2 Sep	Seychelles	3–0	Mozambique	25–19	25–11	25–19			75–49
3 Sep	Cameroon	3–0	Mozambique	25–17	25–13	25–23			75–53
3 Sep	Rwanda	3–1	Seychelles	27–29	25–13	25–10	27–25		104–77
4 Sep	Cameroon	3–0	Seychelles	25–20	25–15	25–20			75–55
4 Sep	Rwanda	3–0	Mozambique	25–17	25–14	25–14			75–45

=== Group B ===
Pos	Team	Pld	W	L	Pts	SW	SL	SR	SPW	SPL	SPR	Qualification
1	Algeria	3	3	0	9	9	3	3.000	295	266	1.109	Semifinals
2	Kenya	3	2	1	6	7	4	1.750	260	229	1.135	Semifinals
3	Nigeria	3	1	2	3	5	6	0.833	258	266	0.970	5th–8th place
4	South Africa	3	0	3	0	1	9	0.111	198	249	0.795	5th–8th place

Date		Score		Set 1	Set 2	Set 3	Set 4	Set 5	Total
2 Sep	Kenya	3–1	Nigeria	23–25	25–22	25–21	25–17		98–85
2 Sep	Algeria	3–1	South Africa	25–20	25–19	22–25	25–19		97–83
3 Sep	Algeria	3–1	Kenya	25–20	25–19	22–25	25–21		94–87
3 Sep	Nigeria	3–0	South Africa	25–18	25–22	27–25			77–65
4 Sep	Algeria	3–1	Nigeria	32–30	25–19	22–25	25–22		104–96
4 Sep	Kenya	3–0	South Africa	25–17	25–16	25–17			75–50

== Knockout stage ==
=== Championship bracket ===
Semi-finals
Cameroon	3
Kenya	2
Rwanda	0
Algeria	3

Final
Cameroon	3
Algeria	2
Third place
Kenya	3
Rwanda	0

=== Semifinals ===
Date		Score		Set 1	Set 2	Set 3	Set 4	Set 5	Total
6 Sep	Cameroon	3–2	Kenya	25–22	23–25	25–17	22–25	15–8	110–97
6 Sep	Algeria	3–0	Rwanda	25–21	25–16	30–28			80–65

=== Third place game ===
Date		Score		Set 1	Set 2	Set 3	Set 4	Set 5	Total
7 Sep	Kenya	3–0	Rwanda	25–15	28–26	25–17			78–58

=== Final ===
Date		Score		Set 1	Set 2	Set 3	Set 4	Set 5	Total
7 Sep	Cameroon	3–2	Algeria	23–25	25–22	25–17	21–25	15–11	109–100

=== 5–8th place bracket ===
Semifinals
Seychelles	3
South Africa	1
Mozambique	0
Nigeria	3

Fifth place game
Seychelles	0
Nigeria	3
Seventh place game
South Africa	3
Mozambique	0

=== Semifinals ===
Date		Score		Set 1	Set 2	Set 3	Set 4	Set 5	Total
6 Sep	Seychelles	3–1	South Africa	26–24	20–25	25–21	25–20		96–90
6 Sep	Nigeria	3–0	Mozambique	25–10	25–15	25–21			75–46

=== Seventh place game ===
Date		Score		Set 1	Set 2	Set 3	Set 4	Set 5	Total
7 Sep	South Africa	3–0	Mozambique	25–14	25–12	25–19			75–45

=== Fifth place game ===
Date		Score		Set 1	Set 2	Set 3	Set 4	Set 5	Total
7 Sep	Nigeria	3–0	Seychelles	25–22	25–23	25–19			75–64

== See also ==
- Volleyball at the 2011 All-Africa Games – Women's tournament
