= Volleyball at the 2008 Summer Olympics – Men's African qualification =

The African Qualification Tournament for the 2008 Men's Olympic Volleyball Tournament was held in Durban, South Africa, from 3 to 9 February 2008.

== Venue ==
- Tongaat Hall, Durban, South Africa

== Preliminary round ==
- All times are South African Standard Time (UTC+02:00).

=== Pool A ===
| Pos | Team | Pld | W | L | Pts | SW | SL | SR | SPW | SPL | SPR | Qualification |
|---|---|---|---|---|---|---|---|---|---|---|---|---|
| 1 | Algeria | 4 | 4 | 0 | 8 | 12 | 1 | 12.000 | 322 | 253 | 1.273 | Semifinals |
| 2 | Cameroon | 4 | 3 | 1 | 7 | 10 | 3 | 3.333 | 311 | 265 | 1.174 | Semifinals |
| 3 | South Africa | 4 | 2 | 2 | 6 | 6 | 9 | 0.667 | 340 | 357 | 0.952 | |
| 4 | Nigeria | 4 | 1 | 3 | 5 | 5 | 10 | 0.500 | 307 | 346 | 0.887 | |
| 5 | Rwanda | 4 | 0 | 4 | 4 | 2 | 12 | 0.167 | 294 | 353 | 0.833 | |

| Date | Time | | Score | | Set 1 | Set 2 | Set 3 | Set 4 | Set 5 | Total |
|---|---|---|---|---|---|---|---|---|---|---|
| 3 Feb | 14:00 | Nigeria | 0–3 | Algeria | 19–25 | 13–25 | 20–25 | | | 52–75 |
| 3 Feb | 19:30 | South Africa | 0–3 | Cameroon | 17–25 | 19–25 | 22–25 | | | 58–75 |
| 4 Feb | 16:00 | Rwanda | 0–3 | Cameroon | 18–25 | 15–25 | 17–25 | | | 75–50 |
| 4 Feb | 20:30 | South Africa | 3–2 | Nigeria | 25–20 | 18–25 | 25–19 | 26–28 | 15–10 | 109–102 |
| 5 Feb | 16:00 | Nigeria | 3–1 | Rwanda | 17–25 | 25–22 | 25–23 | 25–17 | | 92–87 |
| 5 Feb | 20:00 | Algeria | 3–0 | South Africa | 25–18 | 25–20 | 26–24 | | | 76–62 |
| 6 Feb | 16:00 | Algeria | 3–0 | Rwanda | 25–17 | 25–19 | 25–17 | | | 75–53 |
| 6 Feb | 20:00 | Cameroon | 3–0 | Nigeria | 25–22 | 25–18 | 25–21 | | | 75–61 |
| 7 Feb | 16:00 | Algeria | 3–1 | Cameroon | 25–21 | 25–21 | 21–25 | 25–19 | | 96–86 |
| 7 Feb | 20:00 | South Africa | 3–1 | Rwanda | 25–21 | 25–22 | 30–32 | 31–29 | | 111–104 |

=== Pool B ===
| Pos | Team | Pld | W | L | Pts | SW | SL | SR | SPW | SPL | SPR | Qualification |
|---|---|---|---|---|---|---|---|---|---|---|---|---|
| 1 | Egypt | 4 | 4 | 0 | 8 | 12 | 2 | 6.000 | 340 | 261 | 1.303 | Semifinals |
| 2 | Tunisia | 4 | 3 | 1 | 7 | 11 | 3 | 3.667 | 341 | 248 | 1.375 | Semifinals |
| 3 | Morocco | 4 | 2 | 2 | 6 | 6 | 6 | 1.000 | 263 | 236 | 1.114 | |
| 4 | Gabon | 4 | 1 | 3 | 5 | 3 | 9 | 0.333 | 208 | 286 | 0.727 | |
| 5 | Mozambique | 4 | 0 | 4 | 4 | 0 | 12 | 0.000 | 179 | 300 | 0.597 | |

| Date | Time | | Score | | Set 1 | Set 2 | Set 3 | Set 4 | Set 5 | Total |
|---|---|---|---|---|---|---|---|---|---|---|
| 3 Feb | 12:00 | Gabon | 3–0 | Mozambique | 25–16 | 25–23 | 25–22 | | | 75–61 |
| 3 Feb | 16:00 | Morocco | 0–3 | Tunisia | 18–25 | 20–25 | 16–25 | | | 54–75 |
| 4 Feb | 14:00 | Mozambique | 0–3 | Morocco | 16–25 | 15–25 | 12–25 | | | 43–75 |
| 4 Feb | 18:00 | Egypt | 3–2 | Tunisia | 27–25 | 29–27 | 20–25 | 23–25 | 16–14 | 115–116 |
| 5 Feb | 14:00 | Egypt | 3–0 | Gabon | 25–14 | 25–21 | 25–10 | | | 75–45 |
| 5 Feb | 18:00 | Tunisia | 3–0 | Mozambique | 25–13 | 25–9 | 25–12 | | | 75–34 |
| 6 Feb | 14:00 | Morocco | 3–0 | Gabon | 25–11 | 25–19 | 25–13 | | | 75–43 |
| 6 Feb | 18:00 | Egypt | 3–0 | Mozambique | 25–11 | 25–12 | 25–18 | | | 75–41 |
| 7 Feb | 14:00 | Tunisia | 3–0 | Gabon | 25–15 | 25–15 | 25–15 | | | 75–45 |
| 7 Feb | 18:00 | Egypt | 3–0 | Morocco | 25–21 | 25–17 | 25–21 | | | 75–59 |

== Final round ==
- All times are South African Standard Time (UTC+02:00).

Semifinals
8 February
Algeria | 3
Tunisia | 2
8 February
Egypt | 3
Cameroon | 1

Final
9 February
Algeria | 2
Egypt | 3
3rd place match
9 February
Tunisia | 2
Cameroon | 3

=== Semifinals ===
| Date | Time | | Score | | Set 1 | Set 2 | Set 3 | Set 4 | Set 5 | Total |
|---|---|---|---|---|---|---|---|---|---|---|
| 8 Feb | 18:00 | Algeria | 3–2 | Tunisia | 22–25 | 25–22 | 25–22 | 20–25 | 15–8 | 107–102 |
| 8 Feb | 20:00 | Egypt | 3–1 | Cameroon | 19–25 | 25–23 | 25–21 | 28–26 | | 97–95 |

=== 3rd place match ===
| Date | Time | | Score | | Set 1 | Set 2 | Set 3 | Set 4 | Set 5 | Total |
|---|---|---|---|---|---|---|---|---|---|---|
| 9 Feb | 13:00 | Tunisia | 2–3 | Cameroon | 25–20 | 25–22 | 18–25 | 22–25 | 14–16 | 104–108 |

=== Final ===
| Date | Time | | Score | | Set 1 | Set 2 | Set 3 | Set 4 | Set 5 | Total |
|---|---|---|---|---|---|---|---|---|---|---|
| 9 Feb | 15:00 | Algeria | 2–3 | Egypt | 24–26 | 20–25 | 27–25 | 25–22 | 9–15 | 105–113 |

== Final standing ==
| Rank | Team |
|---|---|
| 1 | Egypt |
| 2 | Algeria |
| 3 | Cameroon |
| 4 | Tunisia |
| 5 | Morocco |
| 5 | South Africa |
| 7 | Gabon |
| 7 | Nigeria |
| 9 | Mozambique |
| 9 | Rwanda |

| Qualified for the 2008 Summer Olympics |
| Qualified for the 2008 World Olympic Qualification Tournaments |
