= Volleyball at the African Games =

- Volleyball
- Frequency: Every four years
- Inaugurated: 1965 (Republic of the Congo) Brazzaville
- Most recent: 2023 (Ghana) Accra
- Best: Egypt (EGY)

Volleyball has been an African Games event since the first edition in 1965 in Brazzaville, Republic of the Congo.

== Indoor volleyball ==
=== Men ===
==== Results ====
Year	Host	Final			Third Place Match
Year	Host	Gold Medal	Score	Silver Medal	Bronze Medal	Score	Fourth Place
1965; Details	(Republic of the Congo); Brazzaville	Egypt	3 - 2	Tunisia	Congo	3 - 1	Cameroon
1969	(Mali); Bamako	Disrupted by military coup			Disrupted by military coup
1973; Details	(Nigeria); Lagos	Egypt	3 – 0	Tunisia	Senegal	3 – 2	Ivory Coast
1978; Details	(Algeria); Algiers	Tunisia	3 – 2	Nigeria	Algeria	3 – 2	Ivory Coast
1987; Details	(Kenya); Nairobi	Cameroon	3 – 0	Algeria	Nigeria	3 – 0	Madagascar
1991; Details	(Egypt); Cairo	Algeria	3 – 2	Egypt	Tunisia	3 – 0	Cameroon
1995; Details	(Zimbabwe); Bulawayo	Egypt	3 – 0	Cameroon	Nigeria	3 – 1	Algeria
1999; Details	(South Africa); Johannesburg	Cameroon	3 – 2	Nigeria	Egypt	3 – 1	South Africa
2003; Details	(Nigeria); Abuja	Egypt	3 – 0	Nigeria	Cameroon	3 – 2	Algeria
2007; Details	(Algeria); Blida	Egypt	3 – 1	Tunisia	Algeria	3 – 2	Kenya
2011; Details	(Mozambique); Maputo	Cameroon	3 – 2	Algeria	Kenya	3 – 0	Rwanda
2015; Details	(Republic of the Congo); Brazzaville	Algeria	3 – 0	Congo	Egypt	3 – 2	Rwanda
2019; Details	(Morocco); Rabat	Cameroon	3 – 1	Algeria	Egypt	3 – 1	Morocco
2023; Details	(Ghana); Accra	Egypt	3 – 0	Kenya	Ghana	3 – 2	Cameroon

^n/a A round-robin tournament determined the final standings.

==== Medal table ====
Rank	Nation	Gold	Silver	Bronze	Total
1	Egypt	6	1	3	10
2	Cameroon	4	1	1	6
3	Algeria	2	3	2	7
4	Tunisia	1	3	1	5
5	Nigeria	0	3	2	5
6	Congo	0	1	1	2
6	Kenya	0	1	1	2
8	Ghana	0	0	1	1
8	Senegal	0	0	1	1
Totals (9 entries)		13	13	13	39

=== Women ===
==== Results ====
Year	Host	Final			Third Place Match
Year	Host	Gold Medal	Score	Silver Medal	Bronze Medal	Score	Fourth Place
1978; Details	(Algeria); Algiers	Algeria	3 – 0	Nigeria	Ghana	3 – 2	Tunisia
1987; Details	(Kenya); Nairobi	Egypt	3 – 1	Kenya	Mauritius	3 – 1	Ghana
1991; Details	(Egypt); Cairo	Kenya	3 – 0	Egypt	Cameroon	–	Ghana
1995; Details	(Zimbabwe); Bulawayo	Kenya	3 – 0	Nigeria	Egypt	–
1999; Details	(South Africa); Johannesburg	Kenya	3 – 1	Egypt	Nigeria	3 – 0	South Africa
2003; Details	(Nigeria); Abuja	Nigeria	3 – 2	Egypt	Kenya	3 – 0	Cameroon
2007; Details	(Algeria); Blida	Algeria	3 – 1	Cameroon	Kenya	3 – 0	Seychelles
2011; Details	(Mozambique); Maputo	Algeria	3 – 1	Cameroon	Kenya	3 – 0	Nigeria
2015; Details	(Republic of the Congo); Brazzaville	Kenya	3 – 1	Cameroon	Egypt	3 – 0	Seychelles
2019; Details	(Morocco); Rabat	Kenya	3 – 1	Cameroon	Morocco	3 – 2	Nigeria
2023; Details	(Ghana); Accra	Egypt	3 – 0	Tunisia	Kenya	3 – 0	Ghana

==== Medal table ====
Rank	Nation	Gold	Silver	Bronze	Total
1	Kenya	5	1	4	10
2	Algeria	3	0	0	3
3	Egypt	2	3	2	7
4	Nigeria	1	2	1	4
5	Cameroon	0	4	1	5
6	Tunisia	0	1	0	1
7	Ghana	0	0	1	1
7	Mauritius	0	0	1	1
7	Morocco	0	0	1	1
Totals (9 entries)		11	11	11	33

==== Participating nations ====
Nation	(Algeria) 1978	(Kenya) 1987	Years
Algeria	1st		≥1
Egypt		1st	≥1
Ghana	3rd	4th	2
Kenya		2nd	≥1
Mauritius		3rd	≥1
Nigeria	2nd		≥1
Tunisia	4th		≥1
Total	?	?	

== Medal table, total ==
Rank	Nation	Gold	Silver	Bronze	Total
1	Egypt	8	4	5	17
2	Algeria	5	3	2	10
3	Kenya	5	2	5	12
4	Cameroon	4	5	2	11
5	Nigeria	1	5	3	9
6	Tunisia	1	4	1	6
7	Congo	0	1	1	2
8	Ghana	0	0	2	2
9	Mauritius	0	0	1	1
9	Morocco	0	0	1	1
9	Senegal	0	0	1	1
Totals (11 entries)		24	24	24	72
