= Abdallah Abdalsalam =

Egyptian indoor volleyball player (born 1983)

Personal information
- Full name: Abdallah Abdalsalam Ahmed Bakhit
- Nickname: Bala
- Nationality: Egyptian
- Born: October 10, 1983 (age 43); Egypt
- Height: 1.98 m (6 ft 6 in)
- Weight: 82 kg (181 lb)
- Spike: 336 cm (132 in)
- Block: 320 cm (126 in)

Volleyball information
- Position: Setter
- Current team: Al Ahly (volleyball)
- Number: 2

Career
Years	Teams
2001-2006	(Egypt) Al Ahly SC
2006–2007	(Italy) Sisley Treviso
2007–2008	Montichiari Italy
2009–2010	(Egypt) Al Ahly SC
2011–2012	(Turkey) MEF Okullari Istanbul
2012–2013	(Egypt) Al Ahly SC
2013-2014	(Turkey) Galatsaray
2015– 2017	(Egypt) AL GAISH
2017– present	(Egypt) Al Ahly SC

National team
2003–Now	Egypt
Honours
Men's volleyball
Representing Egypt
African Championship
Gold medal – first place	2005 Egypt
Gold medal – first place	2007 South Africa
Gold medal – first place	2009 Morocco
Gold medal – first place	2011 Morocco
Gold medal – first place	2013 Tunisia
Gold medal – first place	2015 Egypt
Silver medal – second place	2017 Egypt
Mediterranean Games
Gold medal – first place	2005 Almería
- Last updated: 19 April 2018

Abdalla Ahmed Bekhit (Arabic: أحمد عبد الله, born October 10, 1983) is an Egyptian indoor volleyball player. He was included as part of the Egypt national team at the 2008 Summer Olympics. Ahmed was named to the all-tournament team at the FIVB World Grand Champions Cup. He is a setter. He was part of the Egypt men's national volleyball team at the 2010 FIVB Volleyball Men's World Championship in Italy. He played for Al Ahly SC.

== Sporting achievements ==
=== Clubs ===
- Al Ahly SC (Egypt) :

- 12 × Egyptian Volleyball League : 2001/02, 2002/03, 2003/04, 2005/06, 2009/10, 2012/13, 2013/14, 2017/18, 2018/19, 2019/20, 2020/21, 2023/24

- 11 × Egyptian Volleyball Cup : 2001/02, 2002/03, 2003/04, 2004/05, 2005/06, 2009/10, 2012/13, 2017/18, 2018/19, 2019/20, 2023/24

- 2 × Egyptian Super Cup (volleyball) : 2023 - 2024 .

- 8 × African Clubs Championship (volleyball) : 2003 - 2004 - 2006- 2010 - 2018 - 2019 - 2022 - 2024

- 6 × Arab Clubs Championship (volleyball) : 2002 - 2004 - 2006- 2010 - 2020 - 2023 .

- Sisley Treviso (Italy) :

- 1 × Italian Volleyball League : 2006/07.

- 1 × Coppa Italia (volleyball) : 2006/07.

- AL GAISH (Egypt) :

- 2 × Egyptian Volleyball League : 2015/16, 2016/2017.

- 2 × Egyptian Volleyball Cup : 2014/15, 2016/17.

- 1 × African Clubs Championship (volleyball) : 2016

- AL BOUCHRIA Club (Lebanon) Loan for Playoffs

- 1 × Lebanese Volleyball League : 2013/14

=== National team ===
- 6 × Men's African Volleyball Championship : 2005 - 2007 - 2009-2011-2013-2015
- 1 × Volleyball at the 2005 Mediterranean Games : 2005
- 2 × African Games : 2003 - 2007
- 5th place at 2005 FIVB Volleyball Men's World Grand Champions Cup
- 1 × Arab Games : 2006

=== Individually ===
- 2001 Best Server at 2001 FIVB Volleyball Boys' U19 World Championship
- 2005 Best server at 2005 FIVB Volleyball Men's World Grand Champions Cup
- 2005 Best server & Best setter at 2005 Men's African Volleyball Championship
- 2007 Best server & MVP at 2007 Men's African Volleyball Championship
- 2007 MVP at Coppa Italia
- 2009 Best setter at 2009 Men's African Volleyball Championship
- 2011 Best setter at 2011 Men's African Volleyball Championship
- 2017 Best Server at 2017 Men's African Volleyball Championship
- 2017 MVP at African Clubs Championship (volleyball)
