= 1997 Men's African Volleyball Championship =

The 1997 Men's African Volleyball Championship was held in Lagos, Nigeria, with 8 teams participating in the continental sport championship.

== Teams ==
- Algeria
- Botswana
- Cameroon
- Egypt
- Nigeria
- South Africa
- Senegal
- Tunisia

== Competition ==
| 1997 | Tunisia | 3–1 | Algeria | Lagos |

=== Final ===
| 1997 | Tunisia | 3–0 | Cameroon | Lagos |

== Final ranking ==
| Rank | Team |
|---|---|
| 1st place, gold medalist(s) | Tunisia |
| 2nd place, silver medalist(s) | Cameroon |
| 3rd place, bronze medalist(s) | Algeria |
| 4 | Nigeria |
| 5 | Egypt |
| 6 | Senegal |
| 7 | South Africa |
| 8 | Botswana |

1997 Men's African champions

Tunisia
Sixth title
