= Volleyball at the 1999 All-Africa Games =

Continental sporting event

Volleyball at the All-Africa Games

Volleyball at the 1999 All-Africa Games was held in Johannesburg, South Africa for both genders men and women.

== Events ==
=== Medal summary ===
Event	Gold	Silver	Bronze
Men	Cameroon	Nigeria	Egypt
Women	Kenya	Egypt	Nigeria

=== Medal table ===
Rank	Nation	Gold	Silver	Bronze	Total
1	Cameroon	1	0	0	1
1	Kenya	1	0	0	1
3	Egypt	0	1	1	2
3	Nigeria	0	1	1	2
Totals (4 entries)		2	2	2	6
