= Volleyball South Africa =

Governing body of volleyball in South Africa

- Sport: Volleyball; Beach volleyball
- Jurisdiction: South Africa
- Abbreviation: VSA
- Founded: 1992
- Affiliation: FIVB
- Affiliation date: 1992
- Headquarters: Johannesburg
- Location: South Africa
- President: Anthony Mokoena

Official website
- www.volleyballsouthafrica.co.za
- (South Africa)

Volleyball South Africa (VSA) is the governing body for volleyball in South Africa and is responsible for the administration of the South African national volleyball teams (both men's and women's). VSA has been an affiliate of FIVB and CAVB since 1992. Its offices are located in Johannesburg, and its president is Anthony Mokoena. The organization holds its presidential elections every 4 years; the next election is set to occur in 2024.

== History ==
In 1992, it was decided that a single governing body was needed to regulate volleyball in South Africa. VSA was the first national volleyball federation in South Africa to include members of all races. It was a merge of the separate white and black controlled leagues that had been split due to the Apartheid regime, the racist regime that existed in South Africa between the late 1940s to the early 1990s.

The previous division in sport based on race resulted in the existence of two separate bodies, each believing that they were the primary organization responsible for developing the game of volleyball in South Africa. The white athletes were playing for the South African Volleyball Union (SAVU), while the Amateur Volleyball Association of South Africa (AVASA) represented people of color. AVASA had significant ties to the Black Consciousness Movement, which encouraged solidarity between the races, which led many to believe they would be open to forming a unitary organization. This turned out to be incorrect, as AVASA refused to merge their teams with those of white South Africans.

In 1990, a group of administrators broke away from the AVASA to form the South African Volleyball Congress (SAVCON) which championed the desegregation of volleyball and began negotiations between the two entities. These actions were recognized by the National Sports Congress, who were responsible for encouraging unification amongst segregated athletic teams across South Africa. With the encouragement of SAVCON and the National Sports Congress, the AVASA and SAVU began the negotiation process necessary to forming a desegregated national volleyball federation. On 11 February 1992, Volleyball South Africa was created to be the unified national volleyball federation of South Africa

VSA has been recognised by FIVB from 1992 and is a member of CAVB, the African Volleyball Confederation.

== See also ==
- South Africa men's national volleyball team
- South Africa women's national volleyball team
