= Volleyball at the 1995 All-Africa Games =

Volleyball at the All-Africa Games

Volleyball at the 1995 All-Africa Games was held in Bulawayo, Zimbabwe for both genders men and women.

== Events ==
=== Medal summary ===
Event	Gold	Silver	Bronze
Men	Egypt	Cameroon	Nigeria
Women	Kenya	Nigeria	Egypt

=== Medal table ===
Rank	Nation	Gold	Silver	Bronze	Total
1	Egypt	1	0	1	2
2	Kenya	1	0	0	1
3	Nigeria	0	1	1	2
4	Cameroon	0	1	0	1
Totals (4 entries)		2	2	2	6
