= Daniel Nathaniel =

Nigerian volleyball player (born 1992)

- Born: 14 July 1992 (age 33)
- Occupation: Men volleyball player

Daniel Nathaniel (born 14 July 1992) is a Nigerian Men volleyball player who plays in the Nigeria Sunshine Spikers of Akure team and the Nigeria Men's national volleyball team.

== Life ==
He is a graduate of Electrical Electronic Engineering who plays as a setter for the Nigeria Sunshine Spikers volleyball Team, Akure, Ondo State. Daniel also plays in Men volleyball "A" team for the Nigeria Men's national volleyball team.

== Achievements ==
He is the captain of the Nigerian Men's National Volleyball team. Daniel Nathaniel was among the team that won the National Division One Volleyball League in Bauchi in 2019.

He was also part of the team that won the 2022 Regional Unity Invitational Challenge Cup in Kwara State defeating New Waves of Ogun State in the tournament. One of his major achievements was leading the Nigerian men's volleyball team to the 2019 African games in Morocco.
