= 2021 Men's African Nations Volleyball Championship =

2021 Men's African Nations Championship

Tournament details
- Host country: Rwanda
- City: Kigali
- Dates: 7–14 September
- Teams: 16 (from 1 confederation)
- Venue: 2 (in 1 host city)

Final positions
- Champions: Tunisia (11th title)
- Runners-up: Cameroon
- Third place: Egypt
- Fourth place: Morocco

Tournament awards
- MVP: (Morocco) Mohamed Al Hachdadi
- Best Setter: (Tunisia) Khaled Ben Slimene
- Best MB: (Cameroon) Christian Voukeng Mbativou
- Best Libero: (Egypt) Mohamed Hassan (volleyball)

The 2021 Men's African Nations Volleyball Championship was the 23rd edition of the Men's African Volleyball Championship, a biennial international volleyball tournament organised by the African Volleyball Confederation (CAVB) with Rwanda Volleyball Federation (FRVB). The tournament was held in Kigali, Rwanda from 7 to 14 September 2021. The top two teams of the tournament qualified for the 2022 FIVB Volleyball Men's World Championship as the CAVB representatives.

== Qualification ==
16 teams have registered to participate in the 2021 African Championship.

- Guinea originally qualified, but declined to enter.

Means of qualification	Dates	Hosts	Quota	Qualifier(s)
Host nation	—N/a	—N/a	1	Rwanda
2019 African Championship	21–28 July 2019	(Tunisia) Tunis	5	Tunisia; Cameroon; Egypt; Morocco; DR Congo
Zone 2 representatives	—N/a	—N/a	1	Mali; ~~Guinea~~
Zone 3 representatives	—N/a	—N/a	3	Niger; Burkina Faso; Nigeria
Zone 4 representatives	—N/a	—N/a	1	Burundi
Zone 5 representatives	—N/a	—N/a	5	South Sudan; Tanzania; Kenya; Uganda; Ethiopia
Total			16	

== Pools composition ==
Ranking from the previous edition was shown in brackets except the host and the teams who did not participate, which were denoted by (–). The host country and the top 8 ranked teams were seed in the Serpentine system. The 10 remaining teams were drawn in Kigali, Rwanda on 6 September 2021.

Pool A	Pool B	Pool C	Pool D
Rwanda (Hosts)	Tunisia (1)	Cameroon (2)	Egypt (4)
Burkina Faso (–)	Nigeria (–)	DR Congo (8)	Morocco (5)
Burundi (9)	Ethiopia (–)	Mali (–)	Tanzania (–)
Uganda (–)	South Sudan (–)	Niger (–)	Kenya (–)

== Venue ==
Kigali		Kigali (Rwanda)
Kigali Arena	Petit Stade Amahoro	Kigali (Rwanda)
Capacity: 10,000	Capacity: 3,000	Kigali (Rwanda)

== Pool standing procedure ==
1. Number of matches won
2. Match points
3. Sets ratio
4. Points ratio
5. Result of the last match between the tied teams

Match won 3–0 or 3–1: 3 match points for the winner, 0 match points for the loser
Match won 3–2: 2 match points for the winner, 1 match point for the loser.

== Group stage ==
- All times are Central Africa Time (UTC+02:00).

=== Pool A ===
Pos	Team	Pld	W	L	Pts	SW	SL	SR	SPW	SPL	SPR	Qualification
1	Rwanda (H)	3	3	0	8	9	2	4.500	259	181	1.431	Quarterfinals
2	Uganda	3	2	1	7	8	4	2.000	261	234	1.115	Quarterfinals
3	Burundi	3	1	2	3	3	7	0.429	196	237	0.827	9th–16th Quarterfinals
4	Burkina Faso	3	0	3	0	2	9	0.222	211	275	0.767	9th–16th Quarterfinals

(H) Host
- The confederation has decided to postpone the match between Burkina Faso and Burundi, originally scheduled for 10 September at 10:00, in consideration of the health and safety of players and coaches. The match was rescheduled for 10 September at 16:00 after COVID-19 tests for Burundi team were negative.

Date	Time	Venue		Score		Set 1	Set 2	Set 3	Set 4	Set 5	Total	Report
7 Sep	09:00	KGL	Uganda	3–1	Burkina Faso	25–15	25–18	26–28	25–13		101–74	
7 Sep	18:00	KGL	Rwanda	3–0	Burundi	25–15	25–19	25–12			75–46	
9 Sep	14:00	KGL	Burundi	0–3	Uganda	18–25	15–25	18–25			51–75	
9 Sep	18:00	KGL	Burkina Faso	0–3	Rwanda	14–25	20–25	16–25			50–75	
10 Sep	16:00	PTS	Burkina Faso	1–3	Burundi	26–24	20–25	21–25	20–25		87–99	
10 Sep	18:00	KGL	Rwanda	3–2	Uganda	25–15	21–25	23–25	25–11	15–9	109–85	

=== Pool B ===
Pos	Team	Pld	W	L	Pts	SW	SL	SR	SPW	SPL	SPR	Qualification
1	Tunisia	3	3	0	9	9	0	MAX	225	134	1.679	Quarterfinals
2	Nigeria	3	2	1	6	6	4	1.500	236	218	1.083	Quarterfinals
3	Ethiopia	3	1	2	2	4	8	0.500	234	282	0.830	9th–16th Quarterfinals
4	South Sudan	3	0	3	1	2	9	0.222	197	258	0.764	9th–16th Quarterfinals

Date	Time	Venue		Score		Set 1	Set 2	Set 3	Set 4	Set 5	Total	Report
7 Sep	13:00	KGL	South Sudan	2–3	Ethiopia	25–23	20–25	25–20	21–25	9–15	100–108	
7 Sep	20:00	KGL	Nigeria	0–3	Tunisia	15–25	21–25	18–25			54–75	
8 Sep	12:00	KGL	Tunisia	3–0	Ethiopia	25–13	25–14	25–16			75–43	
8 Sep	14:00	KGL	Nigeria	3–0	South Sudan	25–20	25–21	25–19			75–60	
10 Sep	14:00	KGL	South Sudan	0–3	Tunisia	11–25	14–25	12–25			37–75	
10 Sep	16:00	KGL	Ethiopia	1–3	Nigeria	20–25	12–25	34–32	17–25		83–107	

=== Pool C ===
Pos	Team	Pld	W	L	Pts	SW	SL	SR	SPW	SPL	SPR	Qualification
1	Cameroon	3	3	0	9	9	1	9.000	247	166	1.488	Quarterfinals
2	DR Congo	3	2	1	5	7	5	1.400	261	263	0.992	Quarterfinals
3	Mali	3	1	2	2	3	8	0.375	215	264	0.814	9th–16th Quarterfinals
4	Niger	3	0	3	2	4	9	0.444	273	303	0.901	9th–16th Quarterfinals

Date	Time	Venue		Score		Set 1	Set 2	Set 3	Set 4	Set 5	Total	Report
7 Sep	11:00	KGL	Cameroon	3–1	DR Congo	25–19	22–25	25–15	25–17		97–76	
7 Sep	15:00	KGL	Mali	3–2	Niger	21–25	25–20	31–33	26–24	15–12	118–114	
8 Sep	10:00	KGL	Niger	2–3	DR Congo	26–28	23–25	25–21	25–21	11–15	110–110	
8 Sep	16:00	KGL	Mali	0–3	Cameroon	15–25	17–25	9–25			41–75	
9 Sep	10:00	KGL	DR Congo	3–0	Mali	25–17	25–18	25–21			75–56	
9 Sep	12:00	KGL	Cameroon	3–0	Niger	25–17	25–12	25–20			75–49	

=== Pool D ===
Pos	Team	Pld	W	L	Pts	SW	SL	SR	SPW	SPL	SPR	Qualification
1	Egypt	3	2	1	7	8	4	2.000	276	185	1.492	Quarterfinals
2	Morocco	3	2	1	6	7	4	1.750	252	182	1.385	Quarterfinals
3	Kenya	3	2	1	5	7	5	1.400	262	198	1.323	9th–16th Quarterfinals
4	Tanzania	3	0	3	0	0	9	0.000	0	225	0.000	9th–16th Quarterfinals

- The confederation has decided to remove Tanzania from the ongoing tournament for having failed to comply with their financial obligations. Their games were forfeited and will receive zero classification point.

Date	Time	Venue		Score		Set 1	Set 2	Set 3	Set 4	Set 5	Total	Report
8 Sep	18:00	KGL	Morocco	3–0	Tanzania	25–0	25–0	25–0			75–0	
8 Sep	20:00	KGL	Kenya	3–2	Egypt	19–25	25–22	25–20	18–25	15–12	102–104	
9 Sep	16:00	KGL	Egypt	3–0	Tanzania	25–0	25–0	25–0			75–0	
9 Sep	20:00	KGL	Morocco	3–1	Kenya	19–25	25–22	25–17	25–21		94–85	
10 Sep	12:00	KGL	Kenya	3–0	Tanzania	25–0	25–0	25–0			75–0	
10 Sep	20:00	KGL	Egypt	3–1	Morocco	25–21	22–25	25–18	25–19		97–83	

== Final round ==
- All times are Central Africa Time (UTC+02:00).

=== 9th–16th places ===
13th place match
South Sudan	2
Burkina Faso	3
15th place match
Tanzania	0
Ethiopia	3

13th–16th semifinals
Tanzania	0
South Sudan	3
Burkina Faso	3
Ethiopia	1

9th–16th quarterfinals
Burkina Faso	3
Tanzania	0
Mali	3
South Sudan	2
Kenya	3
Burkina Faso	0
Ethiopia	1
Niger	3

9th–12th semifinals
Burkina Faso	2
Mali	3
Kenya	3
Niger	1

9th place match
Mali	0
Kenya	3
11th place match
Burkina Faso	3
Niger	1

==== 9th–16th quarterfinals ====
Date	Time	Venue		Score		Set 1	Set 2	Set 3	Set 4	Set 5	Total	Report
11 Sep	10:00	PTS	Burundi	3–0	Tanzania	25–0	25–0	25–0			75–0	
11 Sep	12:00	PTS	Kenya	3–0	Burkina Faso	25–22	25–13	25–21			75–56	
11 Sep	14:00	PTS	Ethiopia	1–3	Niger	23–25	25–18	20–25	19–25		87–93	
11 Sep	16:00	PTS	Mali	3–2	South Sudan	22–25	25–22	22–25	25–19	15–10	109–101	

==== 13th–16th semifinals ====
Date	Time	Venue		Score		Set 1	Set 2	Set 3	Set 4	Set 5	Total	Report
13 Sep	10:00	PTS	Tanzania	0–3	South Sudan	0–25	0–25	0–25			0–75	
13 Sep	18:00	PTS	Burkina Faso	3–1	Ethiopia	25–19	25–18	25–27	25–21		100–85	

==== 9th–12th semifinals ====
Date	Time	Venue		Score		Set 1	Set 2	Set 3	Set 4	Set 5	Total	Report
13 Sep	12:00	KGL	Burundi	1–3	Mali	18–25	21–25	25–16	16–25		80–91	
13 Sep	20:00	KGL	Kenya	3–1	Niger	25–15	24–26	25–12	25–18		99–71	

==== 15th place match ====
Date	Time	Venue		Score		Set 1	Set 2	Set 3	Set 4	Set 5	Total	Report
14 Sep	09:00	PTS	Tanzania	0–3	Ethiopia	0–25	0–25	0–25			0–75	

==== 13th place match ====
Date	Time	Venue		Score		Set 1	Set 2	Set 3	Set 4	Set 5	Total	Report
14 Sep	11:00	PTS	South Sudan	2–3	Burkina Faso	25–22	25–23	19–25	24–26	9–15	102–111	

==== 11th place match ====
Date	Time	Venue		Score		Set 1	Set 2	Set 3	Set 4	Set 5	Total	Report
14 Sep	13:00	PTS	Burundi	3–1	Niger	15–25	25–23	25–22	25–21		90–91	

==== 9th place match ====
Date	Time	Venue		Score		Set 1	Set 2	Set 3	Set 4	Set 5	Total	Report
14 Sep	15:00	PTS	Mali	0–3	Kenya	21–25	21–25	16–25			58–75	

=== Bracket ===
Fifth place
Rwanda	1
Uganda	3
Seventh place
Nigeria	3
DR Congo	0

Consolation semifinals
Rwanda	3
Nigeria	0
Uganda	3
DR Congo	1

Quarterfinals
Rwanda	0
Morocco	3
Cameroon	3
Nigeria	1
Egypt	3
Uganda	1
Tunisia	3
DR Congo	0

Semifinals
Morocco	2
Cameroon	3
Egypt	1
Tunisia	3

Final
Cameroon	1
Tunisia	3
Third place
Morocco	1
Egypt	3

==== Quarterfinals ====
Date	Time	Venue		Score		Set 1	Set 2	Set 3	Set 4	Set 5	Total	Report
11 Sep	11:00	KGL	Cameroon	3–1	Nigeria	25–19	25–27	25–19	25–20		100–85	
11 Sep	13:00	KGL	Tunisia	3–0	DR Congo	25–22	25–17	25–21			75–60	
11 Sep	15:00	KGL	Egypt	3–1	Uganda	28–30	25–18	25–16	25–21		103–85	
11 Sep	17:00	KGL	Rwanda	0–3	Morocco	17–25	23–25	17–25			57–75	

==== 5th–8th semifinals ====
Date	Time	Venue		Score		Set 1	Set 2	Set 3	Set 4	Set 5	Total	Report
13 Sep	14:00	PTS	Uganda	3–1	DR Congo	23–25	25–21	25–23	25–19		98–88	
13 Sep	16:00	PTS	Rwanda	3–0	Nigeria	25–17	25–22	25–17			75–56	

==== Semifinals ====
Date	Time	Venue		Score		Set 1	Set 2	Set 3	Set 4	Set 5	Total	Report
13 Sep	14:00	KGL	Morocco	2–3	Cameroon	25–15	22–25	25–21	17–25	13–15	102–101	
13 Sep	16:00	KGL	Egypt	1–3	Tunisia	19–25	25–16	14–25	21–25		79–91	

==== 7th place match ====
Date	Time	Venue		Score		Set 1	Set 2	Set 3	Set 4	Set 5	Total	Report
14 Sep	09:30	KGL	Nigeria	3–0	DR Congo	25–10	25–20	25–22			75–52	

==== 5th place match ====
Date	Time	Venue		Score		Set 1	Set 2	Set 3	Set 4	Set 5	Total	Report
14 Sep	11:30	KGL	Rwanda	1–3	Uganda	25–21	23–25	20–25	13–25		81–96	

==== 3rd place match ====
Date	Time	Venue		Score		Set 1	Set 2	Set 3	Set 4	Set 5	Total	Report
14 Sep	15:00	KGL	Morocco	1–3	Egypt	25–23	26–28	21–25	18–25		90–101	

==== Final ====
Date	Time	Venue		Score		Set 1	Set 2	Set 3	Set 4	Set 5	Total	Report
14 Sep	18:00	KGL	Cameroon	1–3	Tunisia	25–16	21–25	21–25	16–25		83–91	

== Final standing ==
Rank	Team
1st place, gold medalist(s)	Tunisia
2nd place, silver medalist(s)	Cameroon
3rd place, bronze medalist(s)	Egypt
4	Morocco
5	Uganda
6	Rwanda
7	Nigeria
8	DR Congo
9	Kenya
10	Mali
11	Burundi
12	Niger
13	Burkina Faso
14	South Sudan
15	Ethiopia
16	Tanzania

Qualified for the 2022 World Championship

2021 Men's African Nations champions

Tunisia
11th title

14–man roster
Yassine Kassis, Ahmed Kadhi, Khaled Ben Slimene, Mohamed Ali Ben Othmen Miladi, Elyes Karamosli, Omar Agrebi, Hamza Nagga, Ismaïl Moalla, Mehdi Ben Cheikh (c), Selim Mbareki, Wassim Ben Tara, Mohamed Ayech, Ali Bongui, Saddem Hmissi
Head coach
(Italy) Antonio Giacobbe

== Awards ==
- Most valuable player
  (Morocco) Mohamed Al Hachdadi
- Best attacker
  (Tunisia) Wassim Ben Tara
- Best blocker
  (Cameroon) Christian Voukeng Mbativou
- Best server
  (Cameroon) Yvan Arthur Kody
- Best setter
  (Tunisia) Khaled Ben Slimene
- Best receiver
  (Morocco) Zouheir El Graoui
- Best libero
  (Egypt) Mohamed Reda

== See also ==
- 2021 Women's African Nations Volleyball Championship
