= Volleyball at the 1987 All-Africa Games =

Volleyball at the All-Africa Games

Volleyball at the 1987 All-Africa Games was held in Nairobi, Kenya for both genders men and women.

== Events ==
=== Medal summary ===
Event	Gold	Silver	Bronze
Men	Cameroon	Algeria	Nigeria
Women	Egypt	Kenya	Mauritius

=== Medal table ===
Rank	Nation	Gold	Silver	Bronze	Total
1	Cameroon	1	0	0	1
1	Egypt	1	0	0	1
3	Algeria	0	1	0	1
3	Kenya	0	1	0	1
5	Mauritius	0	0	1	1
5	Nigeria	0	0	1	1
Totals (6 entries)		2	2	2	6
