= Volleyball at the 2003 All-Africa Games =

Volleyball at the All-Africa Games

The Men's and Women's Volleyball Competition at the 2003 All-Africa Games were held in Abuja, Nigeria from October 11 to October 18, 2003.

== Men's competition ==
=== Group A ===
	Team	Points	G	W	L	PW	PL	Ratio	SW	SL	Ratio
1.	Nigeria	8	4	4	0				12	4	3.000
2.	Algeria	7	4	3	1				11	6	1.833
3.	South Africa	6	4	2	2				8	8	1.000
4.	Ghana	5	4	1	3				7	9	0.777
5.	Senegal	4	4	0	4				1	12	0.083

=== Group B ===
	Team	Points	G	W	L	PW	PL	Ratio	SW	SL	Ratio
1.	Egypt	8	4	4	0				12	1	12.000
2.	Cameroon	7	4	3	1				10	3	3.333
3.	Seychelles	6	4	2	2				6	7	0.857
4.	Rwanda	5	4	1	3				4	10	0.400
5.	Botswana	4	4	0	4				1	12	0.083

=== Final round ===
- October 17 — Semi Finals

Nigeria	3 – 0	Cameroon	25-22 25-21 25-19
Egypt	3 – 1	Algeria	25-17 25-15 23-25 25-18

- October 18 — Bronze Medal Match

Cameroon	3 – 2	Algeria	19-25 22-25 25-20 25-20 15-02

- October 18 — Gold Medal Match

Egypt	3 – 0	Nigeria	25-23 25-23 25-21

== Women's competition ==
=== Group A ===
	Team	Points	G	W	L	PW	PL	Ratio	SW	SL	Ratio
1.	Nigeria	6	3	3	0				9	0	MAX
2.	Cameroon	5	3	2	1				6	5	1.200
3.	Seychelles	4	3	1	2				3	6	0.500
4.	Ghana	3	3	0	3				2	9	0.222
5.	~~Senegal~~	—	—	—	—	—	—	—	—	—	—

=== Group B ===
	Team	Points	G	W	L	PW	PL	Ratio	SW	SL	Ratio
1.	Egypt	8	4	4	0				12	1	12.000
2.	Kenya	7	4	3	1				10	3	3.333
3.	Algeria	6	4	2	2				6	6	1.000
4.	South Africa	5	4	1	3				3	10	0.300
5.	Mozambique	4	4	0	4				1	12	0.083

=== Final round ===
- October 17 — Semi Finals

Nigeria	3 – 1	Kenya	25-22 21-25 25-17 25-20
Egypt	3 – 2	Cameroon	25-20 21-25 25-18 18-25 17-15

- October 18 — Bronze Medal Match

Kenya	3 – 0	Cameroon	25-15 25-18 31-29

- October 18 — Gold Medal Match

Nigeria	3 – 2	Egypt	24-26 25-16 21-25 25-23 15-06
