= Volleyball at the 1973 All-Africa Games =

Volleyball at the All-Africa Games

The 1973 All-Africa Games was the Second Edition of the African Games where Volleyball was contested, but only for men and it was held in Lagos, Nigeria, with Eight national teams has participated.

== Teams ==
- Cameroon
- Egypt
- Ivory Coast
- Mauritius
- Nigeria
- Senegal
- Togo
- Tunisia

== Final ranking ==
Rank	Team
1st place, gold medalist(s)	Egypt
2nd place, silver medalist(s)	Tunisia
3rd place, bronze medalist(s)	Senegal
4	Ivory Coast
5	Togo
6	Nigeria
7	Mauritius
8	Cameroon

1973 African Games winners

Egypt
Second title
