= 2011 Men's African Volleyball Championship =

2011 African Volleyball Championship
Tournament details
- Host country: Morocco
- Dates: September 23–29
- Teams: 8
- Venues: 2 (in 1 host city)

Final positions
- Champions: Egypt (6th title)

The 2011 Men's African Volleyball Championship was held in Tangier, Morocco, from September 23 to September 29, 2011.

== Teams ==
- Algeria
- Botswana
- Cameroon
- Congo
- Egypt
- Morocco
- South Africa
- Tunisia

== Group stage ==
The draw was held on 22 September.

=== Group A ===
Pos	Team	Pld	W	L	Pts	SW	SL	SR	SPW	SPL	SPR	Qualification
1	Cameroon	3	3	0	6	9	4	2.250	304	256	1.188	Semifinals
2	Tunisia	3	2	1	5	8	3	2.667	244	210	1.162	Semifinals
3	Morocco	3	1	2	4	4	6	0.667	216	230	0.939	
4	Botswana	3	0	3	3	1	9	0.111	184	252	0.730	

Date	Time		Score		Set 1	Set 2	Set 3	Set 4	Set 5	Total	Report
23 Sep	14:00	Cameroon	3–2	Tunisia	25–18	20–25	25–17	23–25	15–9	108–94	
23 Sep	18:00	Morocco	3–0	Botswana	29–27	25–18	25–12			79–57	
24 Sep	10:00	Botswana	0–3	Tunisia	15–25	16–25	13–25			44–75	
24 Sep	18:00	Morocco	1–3	Cameroon	15–25	22–25	25–23	17–25		79–98	
25 Sep	14:00	Cameroon	3–1	Botswana	25–17	25–23	23–25	25–18		98–83	
25 Sep	18:00	Morocco	0–3	Tunisia	23–25	16–25	19–25			58–75	

=== Group B ===
Pos	Team	Pld	W	L	Pts	SW	SL	SR	SPW	SPL	SPR	Qualification
1	Egypt	3	3	0	6	9	1	9.000	257	195	1.318	Semifinals
2	Algeria	3	2	1	5	7	4	1.750	263	225	1.169	Semifinals
3	Congo	3	1	2	4	4	6	0.667	219	234	0.936	
4	South Africa	3	0	3	3	0	9	0.000	146	228	0.640	

Date	Time		Score		Set 1	Set 2	Set 3	Set 4	Set 5	Total	Report
23 Sep	10:00	Egypt	3–0	South Africa	25–12	25–14	25–16			75–42	
23 Sep	16:00	Algeria	3–1	Congo	25–19	19–25	25–15	25–20		94–79	
24 Sep	14:00	Congo	3–0	South Africa	25–23	28–26	25–14			78–63	
24 Sep	16:00	Egypt	3–1	Algeria	25–21	26–28	29–27	25–18		105–94	
25 Sep	10:00	Algeria	3–0	South Africa	25–18	25–7	25–16			75–41	
25 Sep	16:00	Egypt	3–0	Congo	25–16	25–18	27–25			77–59	

== Knockout stage ==
=== 5–8th place bracket ===
5th–8th places
September 27, Tangier
Morocco	3
South Africa	0
September 27, Tangier
Congo	3
Botswana	0

Fifth place
September 28, Tangier
Congo	3
Morocco	1
Seventh place
September 28, Tangier
South Africa	3
Botswana	1

==== Classification 5–8 places ====
Date	Time		Score		Set 1	Set 2	Set 3	Set 4	Set 5	Total	Report
27 Sep	14:00	Congo	3–0	Botswana	25–22	25–22	25–18			75–62	
27 Sep	16:00	Morocco	3–0	South Africa	25–19	25–21	25–14			75–54	

==== Seventh place match ====
Date	Time		Score		Set 1	Set 2	Set 3	Set 4	Set 5	Total	Report
28 Sep		Botswana	1–3	South Africa	23–25	22–25	25–21	24–26		94–97	

==== Fifth place match ====
Date	Time		Score		Set 1	Set 2	Set 3	Set 4	Set 5	Total	Report
28 Sep		Congo	3–1	Morocco	25–23	25–22	18–25	25–21		93–91	

=== Championship bracket ===
Semifinals
September 27 – Tangier
Cameroon	3
Algeria	2
September 27 – Tangier
Egypt	3
Tunisia	0

Final
September 29 – Tangier
Cameroon	1
Egypt	3
Third place
September 29 – Tangier
Algeria	1
Tunisia	3

==== Semifinals ====
Date	Time		Score		Set 1	Set 2	Set 3	Set 4	Set 5	Total	Report
27 Sep	18:00	Cameroon	3–2	Algeria	25–16	19–25	19–25	25–21	15–11	103–98	
27 Sep	20:00	Egypt	3–0	Tunisia	25–17	25–17	25–20			75–54	

==== Bronze medal match ====
Date	Time		Score		Set 1	Set 2	Set 3	Set 4	Set 5	Total	Report
29 Sep		Algeria	1–3	Tunisia	26–28	25–19	18–25	22–25		91–97	

==== Final ====
Date	Time		Score		Set 1	Set 2	Set 3	Set 4	Set 5	Total	Report
29 Sep		Cameroon	1–3	Egypt	25–20	18–25	20–25	22–25		85–95	

== Final standing ==
Rank	Team
1st place, gold medalist(s)	Egypt
2nd place, silver medalist(s)	Cameroon
3rd place, bronze medalist(s)	Tunisia
4	Algeria
5	Congo
6	Morocco
7	South Africa
8	Botswana

2011 Men's African champions

Egypt
6th title

Qualified for the 2011 FIVB Men's World Cup

== Awards ==
- MVP: (Egypt) Ahmed Abdelhay
- Best digger: (Tunisia) Anwer Taouerghi
- Best spiker: (Cameroon) Jean Ndaki
- Best blocker: (Cameroon) Sem Dolegombi
- Best server: (Egypt) Ahmed Abdelhay
- Best setter: (Egypt) Abdalla Ahmed
- Best libero: (Algeria) Rafik Djoudi
