= Volleyball at the 2007 All-Africa Games =

Volleyball at the All-Africa Games

The Men's and Women's Volleyball Competition at the 2007 All-Africa Games were held in Algiers, Algeria from 14 July to 22 July 2007.

== Men's competition ==
=== Group A ===
Pos	Team	Pld	W	L	Pts	SW	SL	SR	SPW	SPL	SPR
1	Algeria	5	5	0	10	15	1	15.000	0	0	—
2	Kenya	5	4	1	9	12	3	4.000	0	0	—
3	South Africa	5	3	2	8	9	9	1.000	0	0	—
4	Seychelles	5	1	4	6	6	13	0.462	0	0	—
5	DR Congo	5	1	4	6	5	12	0.417	0	0	—
6	Ghana	5	1	4	6	4	13	0.308	0	0	—

=== Group B ===
Pos	Team	Pld	W	L	Pts	SW	SL	SR	SPW	SPL	SPR
1	Tunisia	5	4	1	9	13	4	3.250	0	0	—
2	Egypt	5	4	1	9	12	4	3.000	0	0	—
3	Cameroon	5	4	1	9	12	5	2.400	0	0	—
4	Nigeria	5	2	3	7	8	10	0.800	0	0	—
5	Senegal	5	1	4	6	3	13	0.231	0	0	—
6	Botswana	5	0	5	5	3	15	0.200	0	0	—

=== Final round ===
- July 21 — Semi Finals

Tunisia	3 – 1	Kenya	25-19 23-25 29-27 25-18
Egypt	3 – 1	Algeria	25-21 26-24 23-25 25-21

- July 22 — Bronze Medal Match

Algeria	3 – 2	Kenya	26-24 22-25 23-25 27-25 15-13

- July 22 — Gold Medal Match

Egypt	3 – 1	Tunisia	21-25 25-16 25-20 25-19

== Women's competition ==
=== Group A ===
Pos	Team	Pld	W	L	Pts	SW	SL	SR	SPW	SPL	SPR
1	Algeria	4	4	0	8	12	0	MAX	0	0	—
2	Seychelles	4	3	1	7	9	7	1.286	0	0	—
3	South Africa	4	2	2	6	8	7	1.143	0	0	—
4	Ethiopia	4	1	3	5	5	9	0.556	0	0	—
5	Ghana	4	0	4	4	1	12	0.083	0	0	—
6	~~DR Congo~~	0	0	0	0	0	0	—	0	0	—

=== Group B ===
Pos	Team	Pld	W	L	Pts	SW	SL	SR	SPW	SPL	SPR
1	Cameroon	5	4	1	9	13	5	2.600	0	0	—
2	Kenya	5	4	1	9	13	6	2.167	0	0	—
3	Tunisia	5	3	2	8	9	7	1.286	0	0	—
4	Nigeria	5	2	3	7	9	11	0.818	0	0	—
5	Egypt	5	2	3	7	9	10	0.900	0	0	—
6	Senegal	5	0	5	5	1	15	0.067	0	0	—

=== Final round ===
- July 21 — Semi Finals

Cameroon	3 – 0	Seychelles	25-16 25-16 25-18
Algeria	3 – 0	Kenya	25-23 25-22 25-20

- July 22 — Bronze Medal Match

Kenya	3 – 0	Seychelles	25-14 25-19 25-13

- July 22 — Gold Medal Match

Algeria	3 – 1	Cameroon	25-17 25-23 16-25 25-16
