= Volleyball at the 2015 African Games =

Tournament details
- Host country: Republic of the Congo
- Dates: 2–14 September
- Teams: 24
- Venue: 1 (in Brazzaville host cities)

Volleyball at the 2015 African Games was held from September 4–14, 2015 at several venues.

== Events ==
=== Schedule ===
P	Preliminaries	½	Semifinals	F	Final

Event↓/Date →	Wed 2	Thu 3	Sat 5	Sun 6	Mon 7	Thu 8	Wed 9	Thu 10	Fri 11	Sat 12	Sun 13	Mon 14
Men	P	P	P	P	P	P	P	P	P	P	½	F
Women	P	P	P	P	P	P	P	P	P	P	½	F

=== Medal summary ===
Event	Gold	Silver	Bronze
Men	Algeria	Congo	Egypt
Women	Kenya	Cameroon	Egypt

=== Medal table ===
* Host nation (Congo)

Rank	Nation	Gold	Silver	Bronze	Total
1	Algeria	1	0	0	1
1	Kenya	1	0	0	1
3	Cameroon	0	1	0	1
3	Congo*	0	1	0	1
5	Egypt	0	0	2	2
Totals (5 entries)		2	2	2	6
