= Algerian Volleyball Federation =

Algerian athletic organization

- Sport: Volleyball; Beach volleyball
- Jurisdiction: Algeria
- Abbreviation: FAVB
- Founded: 1962
- Affiliation: FIVB
- Affiliation date: 1962
- Headquarters: Algiers
- Location: Algeria
- President: Mustapha Lemouchi

Official website
- www.afvb.org
- (Algeria)

The Algerian Volleyball Federation (FAVB) (Arabic: الاتحادية الجزائرية للكرة الطائرة), is the governing body for Volleyball in Algeria since 1962.

== History ==
The Algerian Federation has been recognised by FIVB from 1962 and is a member of the African Volleyball Confederation.

== Competitions ==
=== Men's competitions ===
- Algerian Men's Volleyball League
- Algerian Men's Volleyball League B
- Algerian Men's Volleyball Promotion
- Algerian Men's Volleyball Cup
- Algerian Men's Volleyball Super Cup

=== Women's competitions ===
- Algerian Women's Volleyball League
- Algerian Women's Volleyball Promotion
- Algerian Women's Volleyball Cup
- Algerian Women's Volleyball Super Cup
