= 1991 Men's African Volleyball Championship =

The 1991 Men's African Volleyball Championship was in Cairo, Egypt, with 10 teams participating in the continental championship.

== Teams ==
- Algeria
- Angola
- Ivory Coast
- Cameroon
- Egypt
- Ghana
- Kenya
- Nigeria
- Tunisia
- Zambia

== Competition ==
1991	Tunisia	3–0	Cameroon	Cairo

1991	Algeria	3-2	Tunisia

1991	Tunisia	3--	Nigeria

== Final ranking ==
Rank	Team
1st place, gold medalist(s)	Algeria
2nd place, silver medalist(s)	Egypt
3rd place, bronze medalist(s)	Tunisia
4	Cameroon
5	Nigeria
6	Ghana
7	Kenya
8	Zambia
9	Ivory Coast
10	Angola

Qualified for the 1991 FIVB Men's World Cup and the 1992 Summer Olympics
Qualified for the 1992 Summer Olympics World Qualification
Qualified for the 1991 FIVB Men's World Cup

1991 Men's African champions

Algeria
First title
