= 2017 Men's African Volleyball Championship =

2017 Men's African Championship

Tournament details
- Host country: Egypt
- City: Cairo
- Dates: 22–29 October
- Teams: 14 (from 1 confederation)
- Venue: 2 (in 1 host city)

Final positions
- Champions: Tunisia (9th title)
- Runners-up: Egypt
- Third place: Cameroon
- Fourth place: Algeria

Tournament awards
- MVP: (Tunisia) Ismaïl Moalla

The 2017 Men's African Volleyball Championship was the 21st edition of the Men's African Volleyball Championship, a biennial international volleyball tournament organised by the African Volleyball Confederation (CAVB). The tournament was held in Cairo, Egypt from October 22 to October 29, 2017. Top three teams which had registered for the 2018 FIVB Volleyball Men's World Championship qualified for the 2018 World Championship.

== Qualification ==
17 teams have registered to participate in the 2017 African Championship. But, Cape Verde, Congo and Zambia later withdrew.

Means of qualification	Qualifier
Host country	Egypt
FIVB World Ranking	Tunisia
FIVB World Ranking	Cameroon
FIVB World Ranking	Algeria
Zone 1	Morocco
Zone 2	~~Cape Verde~~
Zone 3	Ghana
Zone 3	Nigeria
Zone 3	Niger
Zone 4	DR Congo
Zone 4	~~Congo~~
Zone 5	Kenya
Zone 5	Rwanda
Zone 6	Botswana
Wild Card	Chad
Wild Card	Libya
Wild Card	~~Zambia~~

== Pools composition ==
The draw was held in Cairo, Egypt on 21 October 2017.

Pool A	Pool B	Pool C	Pool D
Egypt (Hosts)	Tunisia	Cameroon	Algeria
Niger	Ghana	Morocco	Botswana
DR Congo	Kenya	Nigeria	Rwanda
	Libya		Chad

== Venues ==
2017 Men's African Volleyball Championship is located in Egypt	Cairo	
2017 Men's African Volleyball Championship is located in Egypt	Cairo Stadium Indoor Halls Complex	
2017 Men's African Volleyball Championship is located in Egypt	Hall 2	Hall 3
2017 Men's African Volleyball Championship is located in Egypt	Capacity: 1,620	Capacity: 1,500

- Cairo Stadium Indoor Hall 2 – Preliminary round and Final eight
- Cairo Stadium Indoor Hall 3 – Preliminary round and 9th–14th places

== Pool standing procedure ==
1. Number of matches won
2. Match points
3. Sets ratio
4. Points ratio
5. Result of the last match between the tied teams

Match won 3–0 or 3–1: 3 match points for the winner, 0 match points for the loser
Match won 3–2: 2 match points for the winner, 1 match point for the loser.

== Preliminary round ==
- All times are Egypt Standard Time (UTC+02:00).

=== Pool A ===
Pos	Team	Pld	W	L	Pts	SW	SL	SR	SPW	SPL	SPR	Qualification
1	Egypt	2	2	0	6	6	0	MAX	150	71	2.113	Quarterfinals
2	DR Congo	2	1	1	3	3	3	1.000	118	133	0.887	Quarterfinals
3	Niger	2	0	2	0	0	6	0.000	86	150	0.573	9th–14th quarterfinals

Date	Time	Venue		Score		Set 1	Set 2	Set 3	Set 4	Set 5	Total	Report
22 Oct	16:00	CI2	Niger	0–3	Egypt	10–25	6–25	12–25			28–75	
23 Oct	19:00	CI2	DR Congo	0–3	Egypt	14–25	18–25	11–25			43–75	
24 Oct	14:00	CI2	Niger	0–3	DR Congo	19–25	16–25	23–25			58–75	

=== Pool B ===
Pos	Team	Pld	W	L	Pts	SW	SL	SR	SPW	SPL	SPR	Qualification
1	Tunisia	3	3	0	8	9	2	4.500	255	199	1.281	Quarterfinals
2	Libya	3	1	2	4	7	8	0.875	304	304	1.000	Quarterfinals
3	Ghana	3	1	2	4	5	6	0.833	225	239	0.941	9th–12th semifinals
4	Kenya	3	1	2	2	3	8	0.375	213	255	0.835	9th–14th quarterfinals

Date	Time	Venue		Score		Set 1	Set 2	Set 3	Set 4	Set 5	Total	Report
22 Oct	14:00	CI2	Ghana	3–0	Kenya	25–16	26–24	25–15			76–55	
22 Oct	18:00	CI2	Libya	2–3	Tunisia	19–25	25–20	25–20	15–25	7–15	91–105	
23 Oct	15:00	CI2	Libya	3–2	Ghana	25–22	21–25	23–25	25–16	15–10	109–98	
23 Oct	17:00	CI2	Tunisia	3–0	Kenya	25–16	25–19	25–22			75–57	
24 Oct	15:00	CI3	Ghana	0–3	Tunisia	22–25	14–25	15–25			51–75	
24 Oct	18:00	CI2	Kenya	3–2	Libya	16–25	20–25	25–21	25–21	15–12	101–104	

=== Pool C ===
Pos	Team	Pld	W	L	Pts	SW	SL	SR	SPW	SPL	SPR	Qualification
1	Cameroon	2	2	0	6	6	1	6.000	175	154	1.136	Quarterfinals
2	Morocco	2	1	1	3	4	4	1.000	190	184	1.033	Quarterfinals
3	Nigeria	2	0	2	0	1	6	0.167	148	175	0.846	9th–14th quarterfinals

Date	Time	Venue		Score		Set 1	Set 2	Set 3	Set 4	Set 5	Total	Report
23 Oct	18:00	CI3	Morocco	1–3	Cameroon	26–24	23–25	23–25	19–25		91–99	
24 Oct	16:00	CI2	Nigeria	1–3	Morocco	26–24	20–25	17–25	22–25		85–99	
25 Oct	14:00	CI2	Cameroon	3–0	Nigeria	26–24	25–20	25–19			76–63	

=== Pool D ===
Pos	Team	Pld	W	L	Pts	SW	SL	SR	SPW	SPL	SPR	Qualification
1	Algeria	3	3	0	9	9	0	MAX	225	153	1.471	Quarterfinals
2	Rwanda	3	2	1	6	6	3	2.000	211	185	1.141	Quarterfinals
3	Botswana	3	1	2	3	3	6	0.500	174	212	0.821	9th–12th semifinals
4	Chad	3	0	3	0	0	9	0.000	165	225	0.733	9th–14th quarterfinals

Date	Time	Venue		Score		Set 1	Set 2	Set 3	Set 4	Set 5	Total	Report
22 Oct	13:00	CI3	Chad	0–3	Rwanda	20–25	21–25	15–25			56–75	
22 Oct	15:00	CI3	Algeria	3–0	Botswana	25–15	25–13	25–17			75–45	
23 Oct	14:00	CI3	Algeria	3–0	Chad	25–15	25–13	25–19			75–47	
23 Oct	16:00	CI3	Botswana	0–3	Rwanda	19–25	18–25	17–25			54–75	
24 Oct	13:00	CI3	Rwanda	0–3	Algeria	18–25	22–25	21–25			61–75	
24 Oct	17:00	CI3	Chad	0–3	Botswana	20–25	20–25	22–25			62–75	

== Final round ==
- All times are Egypt Standard Time (UTC+02:00).

=== 9th–14th places ===
9th–14th quarterfinals
26 October
Niger	1
Chad	3
26 October
Nigeria	2
Kenya	3

9th–12th semifinals
27 October
Botswana	0
Ghana	3
27 October
Chad	0
Kenya	3

9th place match
28 October
Ghana	3
Kenya	0
11th place match
28 October
Botswana	3
Chad	2

==== 9th–14th quarterfinals ====
Date	Time		Score		Set 1	Set 2	Set 3	Set 4	Set 5	Total	Report
26 Oct	15:00	Niger	1–3	Chad	21–25	21–25	28–26	19–25		89–101	
26 Oct	17:00	Nigeria	2–3	Kenya	20–25	25–20	19–25	25–22	13–15	102–107	

==== 9th–12th semifinals ====
Date	Time		Score		Set 1	Set 2	Set 3	Set 4	Set 5	Total	Report
27 Oct	16:00	Chad	0–3	Kenya	20–25	21–25	20–25			61–75	
27 Oct	18:00	Botswana	0–3	Ghana	24–26	21–25	22–25			67–76	

==== 13th place match ====
Date	Time		Score		Set 1	Set 2	Set 3	Set 4	Set 5	Total	Report
27 Oct	14:00	Niger	0–3	Nigeria	24–26	15–25	20–25			59–76	

==== 11th place match ====
Date	Time		Score		Set 1	Set 2	Set 3	Set 4	Set 5	Total	Report
28 Oct	12:00	Botswana	3–2	Chad	26–24	20–25	21–25	25–17	15–13	107–104	

==== 9th place match ====
Date	Time		Score		Set 1	Set 2	Set 3	Set 4	Set 5	Total	Report
28 Oct	14:00	Ghana	3–0	Kenya	25–22	25–16	25–20			75–58	

=== Final eight ===
Quarterfinals
26 October
Egypt	3
Rwanda	0
26 October
Cameroon	3
Libya	2
26 October
Algeria	3
DR Congo	0
26 October
Tunisia	3
Morocco	0

Semifinals
27 October
Egypt	3
Cameroon	0
27 October
Algeria	2
Tunisia	3

Final
29 October
Egypt	0
Tunisia	3
3rd place match
29 October
Cameroon	3
Algeria	1

5th–8th semifinals
27 October
Rwanda	3
Libya	2
27 October
DR Congo	1
Morocco	3

5th place match
29 October
Rwanda	2
Morocco	3
7th place match
29 October
Libya	3
DR Congo	0

==== Quarterfinals ====
Date	Time		Score		Set 1	Set 2	Set 3	Set 4	Set 5	Total	Report
26 Oct	14:00	Algeria	3–0	DR Congo	25–19	25–13	25–19			75–51	
26 Oct	16:00	Tunisia	3–0	Morocco	25–21	25–17	25–22			75–60	
26 Oct	18:00	Cameroon	3–2	Libya	27–25	22–25	25–21	23–25	15–9	112–105	
26 Oct	20:00	Egypt	3–0	Rwanda	25–14	25–18	25–14			75–46	

==== 5th–8th semifinals ====
Date	Time		Score		Set 1	Set 2	Set 3	Set 4	Set 5	Total	Report
27 Oct	15:00	Rwanda	3–2	Libya	25–19	25–18	12–25	24–26	15–13	101–101	
27 Oct	17:00	DR Congo	1–3	Morocco	25–23	21–25	16–25	20–25		82–98	

==== Semifinals ====
Date	Time		Score		Set 1	Set 2	Set 3	Set 4	Set 5	Total	Report
27 Oct	19:00	Algeria	2–3	Tunisia	27–25	14–25	25–21	23–25	15–17	104–113	
27 Oct	21:00	Egypt	3–0	Cameroon	26–24	25–22	25–23			76–69	

==== 7th place match ====
Date	Time		Score		Set 1	Set 2	Set 3	Set 4	Set 5	Total	Report
29 Oct	14:00	Libya	3–0	DR Congo	25–20	25–10	25–18			75–48	

==== 5th place match ====
Date	Time		Score		Set 1	Set 2	Set 3	Set 4	Set 5	Total	Report
29 Oct	16:00	Rwanda	2–3	Morocco	22–25	25–21	25–16	15–25	9–15	96–102	

==== 3rd place match ====
Date	Time		Score		Set 1	Set 2	Set 3	Set 4	Set 5	Total	Report
29 Oct	18:00	Cameroon	3–1	Algeria	23–25	25–21	25–21	27–25		100–92	

==== Final ====
Date	Time		Score		Set 1	Set 2	Set 3	Set 4	Set 5	Total	Report
29 Oct	21:15	Egypt	0–3	Tunisia	22–25	20–25	15–25			57–75	

== Final standing ==
Rank	Team
1st place, gold medalist(s)	Tunisia
2nd place, silver medalist(s)	Egypt
3rd place, bronze medalist(s)	Cameroon
4	Algeria
5	Morocco
6	Rwanda
7	Libya
8	DR Congo
9	Ghana
10	Kenya
11	Botswana
12	Chad
13	Nigeria
14	Niger

Qualified for the 2018 World Championship

2017 Men's African champions

Tunisia
9th title

Team Roster
Tayeb Korbosli, Ahmed Kadhi, Wassim Ben Tara, Mohamed Ali Ben Othmen Miladi, Elyes Karamosli, Nabil Miladi, Mahdi Ben Cheikh, Hamza Nagga, Ismaïl Moalla, Anouer Taouerghi, Elyes Garfi, Bilel Ben Hassine, Hichem Kaabi, Khaled Ben Slimene, Chokri Jouini, Saddem Hmissi, Omar Agrebi
Head coach
(Italy) Antonio Giacobbe

== Awards ==
- Most valuable player
  (Tunisia) Ismaïl Moalla
- Best spiker
  (Cameroon) Yvan Kody
- Best blocker
  (Algeria) Amin Oumessad
- Best server
  (Egypt) Abdalla Ahmed
- Best setter
  (Tunisia) Khaled Ben Slimene
- Best receiver
  (Egypt) Ahmed Shafik
- Best libero
  (Tunisia) Anouer Taouerghi

== See also ==
- 2017 Women's African Volleyball Championship
