= 1987 Men's African Volleyball Championship =

The 1987 Men's African Volleyball Championship was in Tunis, Tunisia, with 8 teams participating in the continental championship.

== Teams ==
- Algeria
- Cameroon
- Egypt
- Kenya
- Sudan
- Nigeria
- Rwanda
- Tunisia

== Competition ==
December 1987	Tunisia	3–1	Cameroon	El Menzah, Tunis

December 1987	Tunisia	3–1	Egypt	El Menzah, Tunis

=== Final ===
12 December 1987	Tunisia	3–0	Cameroon	El Menzah, Tunis

== Final ranking ==
Rank	Team
1st place, gold medalist(s)	Tunisia
2nd place, silver medalist(s)	Cameroon
3rd place, bronze medalist(s)	Algeria
4	Egypt
5	Nigeria
6	Sudan
7	Rwanda
8	Kenya

Qualified for the 1988 Summer Olympics
Qualified for the 1988 Summer Olympics World Qualification

1987 Men's African champions

Tunisia
Fourth title
