= Volleyball at the 1965 All-Africa Games =

Volleyball at the All-Africa Games

The 1965 All-Africa Games was the First Edition of the African Games where Volleyball was contested, but only for men and it was held in Brazzaville, Republic of the Congo, with Eight national teams has participated.

== Teams ==
- Congo
- Cameroon
- Dahomey
- United Arab Rep.
- Madagascar
- Liberia
- Senegal
- Tunisia

== Final ranking ==
Rank	Team
1st place, gold medalist(s)	United Arab Rep.
2nd place, silver medalist(s)	Tunisia
3rd place, bronze medalist(s)	Congo
4	Cameroon
5	Madagascar
6	Liberia
7	Senegal
8	Dahomey

1965 African Games winners

United Arab Rep.
First title
