= 1983 Men's African Volleyball Championship =

The 1983 Men's African Volleyball Championship was in Port Said, Egypt, with 7 teams participating in the continental championship.

== Teams ==
- Algeria
- Angola
- Cameroon
- Egypt
- Sudan
- Tunisia
- Zimbabwe

== Results ==
1983	Tunisia	3–1	Cameroon	Port Said

1983	Algeria	1–3	Tunisia	Port Said

1983	Egypt	3–1	Tunisia	Port Said

== Final ranking ==
Rank	Team
1st place, gold medalist(s)	Egypt
2nd place, silver medalist(s)	Tunisia
3rd place, bronze medalist(s)	Algeria
4	Cameroon
5	Sudan
6	Angola
7	Zimbabwe

1983 Men's African champions

Egypt
Second title

Qualified for the 1984 Summer Olympics, the 1985 FIVB Men's World Cup and the 1986 FIVB Men's Volleyball World Championship.
Qualified for the 1984 Summer Olympics World Qualification (Tunisia added to the 1984 Summer Olympics after Eastern Bloc boycott)
