= Morocco men's national volleyball team =

National volleyball team

Morocco
- Nickname(s): Atlas Lions
- Association: Morocco Volleyball Association
- Confederation: CAVB
- Head coach: Sandro Passaro
- FIVB ranking: 100 ▲24 (1 October 2026)

Uniforms
Home	Away

African Championship
- Appearances: 13 (First in 1976)
- Best result: (1976, 2013, 2015)
Honours
African Championship
Bronze medal – third place	1976 Tunis	Team
Bronze medal – third place	2013 Sousse	Team
Bronze medal – third place	2015 Cairo	Team
Arab Championship
Silver medal – second place	1977 Kuwait	Team

The Morocco men's national volleyball team represents Morocco in international volleyball competitions.

== Competition record ==
=== African Championship ===
- 1976: (bronze) 3rd place
- 1993: 5th place
- 1995: 4th place
- 1999: 5th place
- 2003: 5th place
- 2005: 4th place
- 2009: 4th place
- 2011: 6th place
- 2013: (bronze) 3rd place
- 2015: (bronze) 3rd place
- 2017: 5th place
- 2019: 5th place
- 2021: 4th place
- 2023: 8th place
- 2026: 4th place

=== Arab Volleyball Championship ===
- 1977: (silver) Runners-up

=== African Games ===
- 2019: 4th place
