= 2009 Men's African Volleyball Championship =

The 2009 Men's African Volleyball Championship is played in Tétouan, Morocco, from 27 September 2009 to 5 October with 9 teams participating in the continental championship.

== Teams ==
- Cameroon
- South Africa
- Morocco
- Libya
- Egypt
- Tunisia
- Gabon
- Algeria
- Botswana

== Preliminary round ==
=== Group A ===
| Pos | Team | Pld | W | L | Pts | SW | SL | SR | SPW | SPL | SPR | Qualification |
|---|---|---|---|---|---|---|---|---|---|---|---|---|
| 1 | Cameroon | 3 | 2 | 1 | 5 | 8 | 5 | 1.600 | 278 | 247 | 1.126 | Semifinals |
| 2 | Morocco | 3 | 2 | 1 | 5 | 8 | 5 | 1.600 | 285 | 256 | 1.113 | Semifinals |
| 3 | Libya | 3 | 2 | 1 | 5 | 8 | 6 | 1.333 | 306 | 302 | 1.013 | Classification 5th–8th |
| 4 | South Africa | 3 | 0 | 3 | 3 | 1 | 9 | 0.111 | 182 | 246 | 0.740 | Classification 5th–8th |

| Date | Time | | Score | | Set 1 | Set 2 | Set 3 | Set 4 | Set 5 | Total | Report |
|---|---|---|---|---|---|---|---|---|---|---|---|
| 27 Sep | 1:13 | Morocco | 3–0 | South Africa | 25–14 | 25–12 | 25–21 | | | 75–47 | |
| 27 Sep | 1:49 | Libya | 2–3 | Cameroon | 16–25 | 25–19 | 22–25 | 25–21 | 11–15 | 99–105 | |
| 28 Sep | 1:45 | Morocco | 3–2 | Cameroon | 25–16 | 15–25 | 19–25 | 25–19 | 15–13 | 99–98 | |
| 29 Sep | 1:31 | Libya | 3–1 | South Africa | 25–21 | 25–21 | 21–25 | 25–19 | | 96–86 | |
| 30 Sep | 1:06 | South Africa | 0–3 | Cameroon | 16–25 | 13–25 | 20–25 | | | 49–75 | |
| 01 Oct | 2:08 | Libya | 3–2 | Morocco | 28–26 | 19–25 | 25–22 | 24–26 | 15–12 | 111–111 | |

=== Group B ===
| Pos | Team | Pld | W | L | Pts | SW | SL | SR | SPW | SPL | SPR | Qualification |
|---|---|---|---|---|---|---|---|---|---|---|---|---|
| 1 | Egypt | 4 | 4 | 0 | 8 | 12 | 2 | 6.000 | 346 | 268 | 1.291 | Semifinals |
| 2 | Algeria | 4 | 3 | 1 | 7 | 10 | 3 | 3.333 | 310 | 253 | 1.225 | Semifinals |
| 3 | Tunisia | 4 | 2 | 2 | 6 | 7 | 6 | 1.167 | 306 | 270 | 1.133 | Classification 5th–8th |
| 4 | Botswana | 4 | 1 | 3 | 5 | 3 | 9 | 0.333 | 220 | 287 | 0.767 | Classification 5th–8th |
| 5 | Gabon | 4 | 0 | 4 | 4 | 0 | 12 | 0.000 | 198 | 302 | 0.656 | |

| Date | Time | | Score | | Set 1 | Set 2 | Set 3 | Set 4 | Set 5 | Total | Report |
|---|---|---|---|---|---|---|---|---|---|---|---|
| 27 Sep | 1:12 | Egypt | 3–0 | Gabon | 25–09 | 25–17 | 25–19 | | | 75–45 | |
| 27 Sep | 1:14 | Botswana | 0–3 | Tunisia | 19–25 | 10–25 | 18–25 | | | 47–75 | |
| 28 Sep | 1:04 | Tunisia | 3–0 | Gabon | 25–13 | 25–16 | 25–19 | | | 75–48 | |
| 28 Sep | 1:55 | Egypt | 3–1 | Algeria | 25–21 | 25–19 | 21–25 | 25–20 | | 96–85 | |
| 29 Sep | 1:05 | Egypt | 3–0 | Botswana | 25–13 | 25–18 | 25–17 | | | 75–48 | |
| 29 Sep | 1:02 | Algeria | 3–0 | Gabon | 25–11 | 25–09 | 25–23 | | | 75–43 | |
| 30 Sep | 1:02 | Algeria | 3–0 | Botswana | 25–16 | 25–18 | 25–14 | | | 75–48 | |
| 30 Sep | 1:35 | Egypt | 3–1 | Tunisia | 25–27 | 25–23 | 25–20 | 25–20 | | 100–90 | |
| 01 Oct | 1:19 | Botswana | 3–0 | Gabon | 25–17 | 25–20 | 27–25 | | | 77–62 | |
| 01 Oct | 1:11 | Tunisia | 0–3 | Algeria | 22–25 | 22–25 | 22–25 | | | 66–75 | |

== Final round ==
Semi-finals
2009-10-03 Tetouan
Cameroon | 2
Algeria | 3
2009-10-03 Tetouan
Egypt | 3
Morocco | 0

Final
2009-10-04 Tetouan
Algeria | 0
Egypt | 3
3rd place
2009-10-04 Tetouan
Cameroon | 3
Morocco | 1

Semifinals

| Date | | Score | | Set 1 | Set 2 | Set 3 | Set 4 | Set 5 | Total |
|---|---|---|---|---|---|---|---|---|---|
| 03 Oct | Cameroon | 2–3 | Algeria | 19–25 | 26–28 | 25–22 | 25–14 | 13–15 | 102–100 |
| 03 Oct | Egypt | 3–0 | Morocco | 25–18 | 25–20 | 25–18 | | | 75–56 |

Bronze medal match

| Date | | Score | | Set 1 | Set 2 | Set 3 | Set 4 | Set 5 | Total |
|---|---|---|---|---|---|---|---|---|---|
| 04 Oct | Cameroon | 3–1 | Morocco | 25–18 | 22–25 | 25–19 | 25–15 | | 97–77 |

Final

| Date | | Score | | Set 1 | Set 2 | Set 3 | Set 4 | Set 5 | Total |
|---|---|---|---|---|---|---|---|---|---|
| 04 Oct | Algeria | 0–3 | Egypt | 21–25 | 16–25 | 11–25 | | | 48–75 |

=== Classification 5th–8th ===
5th–8th places
2009-10-03 – Tetouan
Libya | 3
Botswana | 2
2009-10-03 – Tetouan
Tunisia | 3
South Africa | 0

5th place
2009-10-04 – Tetouan
Libya | 1
Tunisia | 3
7th place
2009-10-04 – Tetouan
Botswana | 2
South Africa | 3

| Date | | Score | | Set 1 | Set 2 | Set 3 | Set 4 | Set 5 | Total |
|---|---|---|---|---|---|---|---|---|---|
| 03 Oct | Libya | 3–2 | Botswana | 25–20 | 22–25 | 25–11 | 19–25 | 15–13 | 106–94 |
| 03 Oct | Tunisia | 3–0 | South Africa | 25–13 | 25–11 | 25–16 | | | 75–40 |

| Date | | Score | | Set 1 | Set 2 | Set 3 | Set 4 | Set 5 | Total |
|---|---|---|---|---|---|---|---|---|---|
| 04 Oct | Botswana | 2–3 | South Africa | 23–25 | 25–21 | 23–25 | 25–17 | 11–15 | 107–103 |
| 04 Oct | Libya | 1–3 | Tunisia | 25–14 | 23–25 | 15–25 | 19–25 | | 81–89 |

== Final standing ==
| Rank | Team |
|---|---|
| 1st place, gold medalist(s) | Egypt |
| 2nd place, silver medalist(s) | Algeria |
| 3rd place, bronze medalist(s) | Cameroon |
| 4 | Morocco |
| 5 | Tunisia |
| 6 | Libya |
| 7 | South Africa |
| 8 | Botswana |
| 9 | Gabon |

2009 Men's African champions

Egypt
5th title
