= Volleyball at the 1991 All-Africa Games =

Volleyball at the All-Africa Games

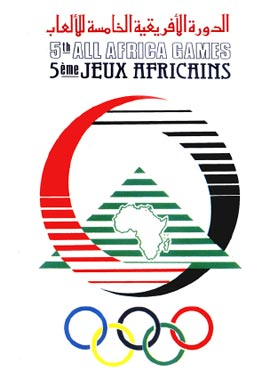
Logo of the 1991 All-Africa Games

Volleyball at the 1991 All-Africa Games was held in Cairo, Egypt for both genders men and women.

== Events ==
=== Medal summary ===
Event	Gold	Silver	Bronze
Men	Algeria	Egypt	Tunisia
Women	Kenya	Egypt	Cameroon

=== Medal table ===
Rank	Nation	Gold	Silver	Bronze	Total
1	Algeria	1	0	0	1
1	Kenya	1	0	0	1
3	Egypt	0	2	0	2
4	Cameroon	0	0	1	1
4	Tunisia	0	0	1	1
Totals (5 entries)		2	2	2	6
