= 1999 Men's African Volleyball Championship =

Volleyball competition

The 1999 Men's African Volleyball Championship was in Cairo, Egypt, with 6 teams participating in the continental championship.

== Teams ==
- Algeria
- Cameroon
- Egypt
- Ghana
- Morocco
- Tunisia

== Results ==
1999	Tunisia	3–0	Cameroon	Cairo

1999	Tunisia	3–1	Algeria	Cairo

1999	Tunisia	3–0	Morocco	Cairo

=== Final ===
1999	Tunisia	3–1	Egypt	Cairo

== Final ranking ==
Rank	Team
1st place, gold medalist(s)	Tunisia
2nd place, silver medalist(s)	Egypt
3rd place, bronze medalist(s)	Algeria
4	Cameroon
5	Morocco
6	Ghana

Qualified for the 1999 FIVB Men's World Cup

1999 Men's African champions

Tunisia
Seventh title
