= Algeria men's national volleyball team =

National volleyball team

Algeria
- Association: Algerian Volleyball Federation (AVF)
- Confederation: CAVB
- Head coach: Kamel Imeloul
- FIVB ranking: 77 ▼3 (15 October 2026)

Uniforms
Home	Away

Summer Olympics
- Appearances: 1 (First in 1992)
- Best result: 12th (1992)

World Championship
- Appearances: 3 (First in 1994)
- Best result: 13th (1994)

World Cup
- Appearances: 1 (First in 1991)
- Best result: 9th (1991)

African Championship
- Appearances: 18 (First in 1967)
- Best result: (1991, 1993)
- www.afvb.org

Algeria men's national volleyball team
Medal record

African Games
Gold medal – first place	1991 Cairo	Team
Gold medal – first place	2015 Brazzaville	Team
Silver medal – second place	1987 Nairobi	Team
Silver medal – second place	2011 Maputo	Team
Silver medal – second place	2019 Rabat	Team
Bronze medal – third place	1978 Algiers	Team
Bronze medal – third place	2007 Algiers	Team

African Championship
Gold medal – first place	1991 Cairo	Team
Gold medal – first place	1993 Algiers	Team
Silver medal – second place	1967 Tunis	Team
Silver medal – second place	1989 Abidjan	Team
Silver medal – second place	2009 Tetouan	Team
Silver medal – second place	2023 Cairo	Team
Bronze medal – third place	1983 Port Said	Team
Bronze medal – third place	1987 Tunis	Team
Bronze medal – third place	1995 Tunis	Team
Bronze medal – third place	1997 Lagos	Team
Bronze medal – third place	1999 Cairo	Team
Bronze medal – third place	2019 Tunis	Team
Bronze medal – third place	2026 Tunis	Team

The Algeria men's national volleyball team represents Algeria in international volleyball competitions. The team is governed by the Algerian Volleyball Federation, which represents the country in international competitions and friendly matches.

== Competition record ==
=== Olympic Games ===
- 1992 — 12th place

=== World Championship ===
- 1994 — 13th place
- 1998 — 19th place
- 2025 — 32nd place

=== World Cup ===
- 1991 — 9th place

=== African Nations Championship ===
- 1967 — (silver) Runners-up
- 1983 — (bronze) 3rd place
- 1987 — (bronze) 3rd place
- 1989 — (silver) Runners-up
- 1991 — (gold) Champions
- 1993 — (gold) Champions
- 1995 — (bronze) 3rd place
- 1997 — (bronze) 3rd place
- 1999 — (bronze) 3rd place
- 2003 — 4th place
- 2009 — (silver) Runners-up
- 2011 — 4th place
- 2013 — 5th place
- 2015 — 4th place
- 2017 — 4th place
- 2019 — (bronze) 3rd place
- 2023 — (silver) Runners-up
- 2026 — (bronze) 3rd place

=== African Games ===
- 1978 — (bronze) 3rd place
- 1987 — (silver) Runners-up
- 1991 — (gold) Champions
- 2003 — 4th place
- 2007 — (bronze) 3rd place
- 2011 — (silver) Runners-up
- 2015 — (gold) Champions
- 2019 — (silver) Runners-up

=== Mediterranean Games ===
- 1991 — 8th place
- 1993 — 5th place
- 2013 — 6th place
- 2018 — 9th place
- 2022 — 9th place
- 2026 — 11th place

=== Arab Volleyball Championship ===
- 1984 — 2nd — Runners-up
- 1994 — 1st — Champions
- 1996 — 3rd place
- 1998 — 1st — Champions
- 2000 — 2nd — Runners-up
- 2002 — 2nd — Runners-up
- 2006 — 3rd place
- 2008 — 4th place
- 2014 — 3rd place

=== Arab Games ===
- 1997 — 1st — Champions
- 2004 — 2nd — Runners-up
- 2011 — 3rd place
- 2023 — 2nd — Runners-up

== Team ==
=== Current squad ===
The following is Algeria's roster for the 2025 FIVB Men's Volleyball World Championship.

Head coach: (Algeria) Kamel Imeloul

- 2 Sofiane Bouyoucef MB
- 4 Abderrahim Arab MB
- 5 Houssam Zerouka L
- 6 Yasser Amrat OH
- 7 Adil Kadri MB
- 8 Boudjemaa Ikken OP
- 9 Samir Chikhi MB
- 10 Youssouf Bourouba OP
- 11 Soufiane Hosni OH
- 12 Sidi Mohamed Dour OH
- 14 Ayyoub Dekkiche OH
- 15 Abi Ayad Mohamed Oualid L
- 18 Farouk Tizit OH
- 19 Abderaouf Hamimes S

== See also ==
- Algeria women's national volleyball team
- Algerian Volleyball Federation
