= 1993 Men's African Volleyball Championship =

The 1993 Men's African Volleyball Championship was in Algiers, Algeria, with 10 teams participating in the continental championship.

== Teams ==
- Algeria
- Botswana
- Ivory Coast
- DR Congo
- Egypt
- Kenya
- Morocco
- South Africa
- Seychelles
- Tunisia

== Competition ==
Semifinals
1- September
Tunisia | 3
Egypt | 2
1- September
Algeria | 3
Seychelles | ?

Final
16 September
Algeria | 3
Tunisia | 0
3rd place match
16 September
Egypt | 3
Seychelles | 0

| 5th place match |
| 16 September |
| Morocco | 3 |
| DR Congo | ? |

=== Semifinals ===
| Date | Time | | Score | | Set 1 | Set 2 | Set 3 | Set 4 | Set 5 | Total | Report |
|---|---|---|---|---|---|---|---|---|---|---|---|
| 1- Sep | | Tunisia | 3–2 | Egypt | | | | | | | |
| 1- Sep | | Algeria | 3–? | Seychelles | | | | | | | |

=== 5th place match ===
| Date | Time | | Score | | Set 1 | Set 2 | Set 3 | Set 4 | Set 5 | Total | Report |
|---|---|---|---|---|---|---|---|---|---|---|---|
| 16 Sep | | Morocco | 3-? | DR Congo | | | | | | | |

=== 3rd place match ===
| Date | Time | | Score | | Set 1 | Set 2 | Set 3 | Set 4 | Set 5 | Total | Report |
|---|---|---|---|---|---|---|---|---|---|---|---|
| 16 Sep | | Egypt | 3–0 | Seychelles | 15–4 | 15–5 | 16–14 | | | 46–23 | |

=== Final ===
| Date | Time | | Score | | Set 1 | Set 2 | Set 3 | Set 4 | Set 5 | Total | Report |
|---|---|---|---|---|---|---|---|---|---|---|---|
| 16 Sep | | Algeria | 3-0 | Tunisia | 15–8 | 15–1 | 15–8 | | | 45–17 | |

== Final ranking ==
| Rank | Team |
|---|---|
| 1st place, gold medalist(s) | Algeria |
| 2nd place, silver medalist(s) | Tunisia |
| 3rd place, bronze medalist(s) | Egypt |
| 4 | Seychelles |
| 5 | Morocco |
| 6 | DR Congo |
| 7 | Kenya |
| 8 | South Africa |
| 9 | Ivory Coast |
| 10 | Botswana |

| Qualified for the 1994 FIVB Men's Volleyball World Championship |
| Qualified for the 1994 FIVB World Championship Qualification Tournament |

1993 Men's African champions

Algeria
Second title
