= Volleyball at the 1978 All-Africa Games =

Volleyball at the All-Africa Games

Volleyball at the 1978 All-Africa Games was held in Algiers, Algeria and in the first time women competition was included.

== Events ==
=== Medal summary ===
Event	Gold	Silver	Bronze
Men	Tunisia	Nigeria	Algeria
Women	Algeria	Nigeria	Ghana

=== Medal table ===
Rank	Nation	Gold	Silver	Bronze	Total
1	Algeria	1	0	1	2
2	Tunisia	1	0	0	1
3	Nigeria	0	2	0	2
4	Ghana	0	0	1	1
Totals (4 entries)		2	2	2	6
