= 1995 Men's African Volleyball Championship =

Tournament details
- Host country: Tunisia
- Dates: 13–21 October 1995
- Teams: 6
- Venue: 1 (in 1 host city)

Final positions
- Champions: Tunisia (5th title)

The 1995 Men's African Volleyball Championship was held in Tunis, Tunisia, from October 13 to October 21, with six teams participating in the continental championship.

== Teams ==
- Algeria
- Cameroon
- Egypt
- Kenya
- Morocco
- Tunisia

== Results ==
=== Round-robin ===
13 October 1995	Tunisia	3–0	Kenya	El Menzah, Tunis

14 October 1995	Egypt	3–1	Algeria	El Menzah, Tunis

Morocco	3–2	Cameroon	El Menzah, Tunis

15 October 1995	Tunisia	3–1	Morocco	El Menzah, Tunis

16 October 1995	Egypt	3–0 [15-9 15-8 15-6]	Kenya	El Menzah, Tunis

17 October 1995	Cameroon	3–0	Kenya	El Menzah, Tunis

Tunisia	3–0	Egypt	El Menzah, Tunis

16 October 1995	Egypt	3–1	Morocco	El Menzah, Tunis

20 October 1995	Tunisia	3–0	Cameroon	El Menzah, Tunis

21 October 1995	Tunisia	3–1	Algeria	El Menzah, Tunis

Egypt	v	Cameroon	El Menzah, Tunis

== Final ranking ==
Rank	Team
1st place, gold medalist(s)	Tunisia
2nd place, silver medalist(s)	Egypt
3rd place, bronze medalist(s)	Algeria
4	Morocco
5	Cameroon
6	Kenya

Qualified for the 1995 FIVB Men's World Cup

1995 Men's African champions

Tunisia
Fifth title
