= 1967 Men's African Volleyball Championship =

The 1967 Men's African Volleyball Championship was in Tunis, Tunisia, with 4 teams participating in the continental championship.

== Teams ==
- Algeria
- Guinea
- Libya
- Tunisia

== Results ==
| 1967 | Tunisia | 3–0 | Guinea | Salambo, La Goulette |

| 1967 | Tunisia | 3–0 | Libya | Salambo, La Goulette |

| 1967 | Tunisia | 3–0 | Algeria | Salambo, La Goulette |

== Final ranking ==
| Rank | Team |
|---|---|
| 1st place, gold medalist(s) | Tunisia |
| 2nd place, silver medalist(s) | Algeria |
| 3rd place, bronze medalist(s) | Guinea |
| 4 | Libya |

| Qualified for the 1968 Summer Olympics. (Tunisia withdrew in the spring of 1968, and replaced by Bulgaria) |

1967 Men's African champions

Tunisia
First title

Team Roster
Hassine Belkhouja, Raouf El Bahri, Moncef Ben Sultan, Belaid Raissi, Moncef Hadded, Naceur Bounattouf, Raja Haider, Fathi Caid Sebsi, Sami El Bahri, Mokhtar El Karoui, Hedi Boulila
Head Coach: Josef Brož
