= 1971 Men's African Volleyball Championship =

The 1971 Men's African Volleyball Championship was in Cairo, Egypt, with 7 teams participating in the continental championship.

== Teams ==
- Ivory Coast
- Cameroon
- Egypt
- Madagascar
- Senegal
- Togo
- Tunisia

== Results ==
| 1971 | Tunisia | 3–0 | Cameroon | Cairo |

| 1971 | Tunisia | 3–1 | Senegal | Cairo |

=== Final ===
| 1971 | Egypt | 2–3 | Tunisia | Cairo |

== Final ranking ==
| Rank | Team |
|---|---|
| 1st place, gold medalist(s) | Tunisia |
| 2nd place, silver medalist(s) | Egypt |
| 3rd place, bronze medalist(s) | Madagascar |
| 4 | Cameroon |
| 5 | Senegal |
| 6 | Ivory Coast |
| 7 | Togo |

| Qualified for the 1972 Summer Olympics |

1971 Men's African champions

Tunisia
Second title
