= 1976 Men's African Volleyball Championship =

The 1976 Men's African Volleyball Championship was in Tunis, Tunisia, with 7 teams participating in the continental championship.

== Teams ==
- Ivory Coast
- Congo
- Egypt
- Madagascar
- Morocco
- Senegal
- Tunisia

== Results ==
1976	Tunisia	3–1	Morocco	Palais de la foire, Tunis

1976	Tunisia	3–0	Senegal	Palais de la foire, Tunis

== Final ranking ==
Rank	Team
1st place, gold medalist(s)	Egypt
2nd place, silver medalist(s)	Tunisia
3rd place, bronze medalist(s)	Morocco
4	Senegal
5	Madagascar
6	Ivory Coast
7	Congo

1976 Men's African champions

Egypt
First title

Qualified for the 1977 FIVB Men's World Cup, the 1978 FIVB Men's Volleyball World Championship and the 1976 Summer Olympics (Withdrew following the African boycott)
Qualified for the 1978 FIVB Men's Volleyball World Championship
