= African Volleyball Confederation =

Continental governing body for the sports of volleyball in Africa

African Volleyball Confederation (CAVB)
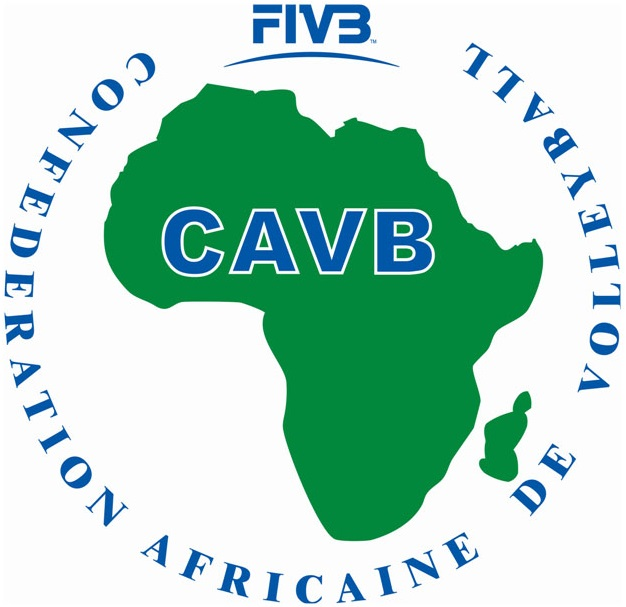
- Abbreviation: CAVB
- Formation: 1972
- Type: Continental sports organisation
- Headquarters: 10 Rue Mohamed Errounda, Rabat, Morocco
- Members: 54 member associations
- President: (Morocco) Bouchra Hajij
- Parent organization: FIVB

The African Volleyball Confederation (French: Confédération Africaine de Volleyball, or CAVB) is the continental governing body for the sports of volleyball in Africa. Its headquarters are located in Rabat, Morocco.

== Profile ==
The CAVB was the last confederation to be created: it was established in 1972, when the FIVB turned its five Volleyball Zone Commissions into continental confederations. The African Volleyball Commission had been founded in 1967.

Although the national federation of Egypt was involved in the founding of the FIVB in 1947, the sport of volleyball remains essentially amateur in Africa, even in countries which maintain consistent Olympic programmes, such as South Africa or Kenya. There has been considerable effort by the international federation to increase competitivity in the continent through special development actions. The results of these measures are, As of 2005, still timid.

The CAVB's headquarters are located in Rabat, Morocco.

The CAVB is responsible for national volleyball federations located in Africa and organizes continental competitions such as the African Volleyball Championship (first edition, 1967). It also takes part in the organization of qualification tournaments for major events such as the Olympic Games or the men's and women's world championships, and of international competitions hosted by one of its affiliated federations.

== Teams ==
As of 2024, no African team has ever been able to obtain impressive results in international competitions, neither in women's nor in men's events. It could be argued that Egypt has some tradition in the sport, since it is the oldest of all the national federations affiliated to the CAVB.

Judging from participation in international events, which is usually granted through continental qualification procedures, one may attribute predominance on the continent to the teams of Egypt and Tunisia in men's volleyball and Kenya, Egypt, and Tunisia in women's volleyball.

== CAVB zones ==
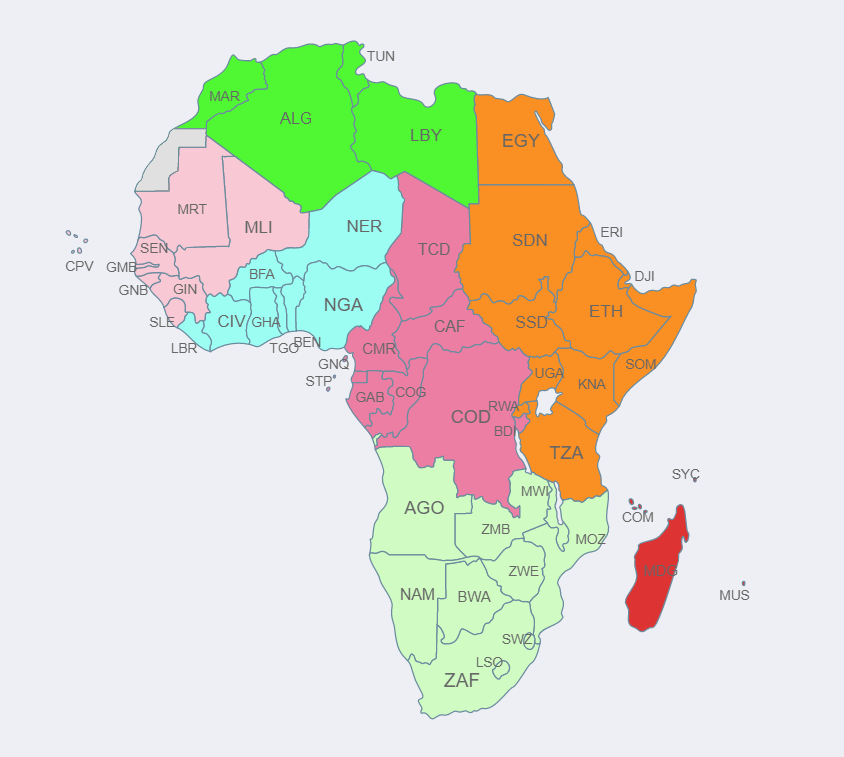
CAVB zones

Number	Zone	Members
1	Zone 1 – North Zone	4
2	Zone 2 – West Zone A	8
3	Zone 3 – West Zone B	8
4	Zone 4 – Central Zone	9
5	Zone 5 – East Zone	11
6	Zone 6 – Southern Zone A	10
7	Zone 7 – Southern Zone B	4

== Affiliated federations ==
As of 2020, the following 54 national federations were affiliated to the CAVB that was divided into 5 subregions and 7 zones.

Code	Country	Federation	Zone
Northern Africa
ALG	Algeria	Algerian Volleyball Federation	1
EGY	Egypt	Egyptian Volleyball Federation	5
LBA	Libya	Libyan Volleyball Federation	1
MAR	Morocco	Moroccan Royal Volleyball Federation	1
SUD	Sudan	Sudan Volleyball Association	5
TUN	Tunisia	Tunisian Volleyball Federation	1
Western Africa
BEN	Benin	Fédération Beninoise de Volley-Ball	3
BUR	Burkina Faso	Federation Burkinabe de Volley-Ball	3
CPV	Cape Verde	Federação Cabo-Verdiana de Voleibol	2
GAM	Gambia	Gambia Volleyball Association	2
GHA	Ghana	Ghana Volleyball Association	3
GUI	Guinea	Fédération Guineenne de Volley-Ball	2
GBS	Guinea-Bissau	Federação de Voleibol da Guine-Bissau	2
CIV	Ivory Coast	Fédération Ivoirienne de Volley-Ball	3
LBR	Liberia	Liberia Volleyball Federation	3
MLI	Mali	Fédération Malienne de Volleyball	2
MTN	Mauritania	Fédération Mauritanienne de Volley-Ball	2
NIG	Niger	Fédération Nigerienne de Volley-Ball	3
NGR	Nigeria	Nigerian Volleyball Federation	3
SEN	Senegal	Fédération Senegalaise De Volley-Ball	2
SLE	Sierra Leone	Fédération de Volleyball de la Sierra Leone	2
TOG	Togo	Fédération Togolaise de Volley-Ball	3
Middle Africa
ANG	Angola	Federação Angolana de Voleibol	6
CMR	Cameroon	Fédération Camerounaise De Volley-Ball	4
CAF	Central African Republic	Federation Centrafricaine de Volleyball	4
CHA	Chad	Fédération Tchadienne de Volley-Ball	4
COD	Democratic Republic of the Congo	Fédération de Volley-Ball du Congo	4
GEQ	Equatorial Guinea	Federación Ecuatoguineana de Voleibol	4
GAB	Gabon	Federation Gabonaise de Volley-Ball	4
CGO	Republic of the Congo	Fédération Congolaise de Volley-Ball	4
STP	São Tomé and Príncipe	Federação Santomense de Voleibol	4
Eastern Africa
BDI	Burundi	Fédération Burundaise de Volleyball	4
COM	Comoros	Fédération Comorienne de Volley-Ball	7
DJI	Djibouti	Fédération Djiboutienne de Volley-Ball	5
ERT	Eritrea	Eritrean National Volleyball Federation	5
ETH	Ethiopia	Ethiopian Volleyball Federation	5
KEN	Kenya	Kenya Volleyball Federation	5
MAD	Madagascar	Fédération Malagasy de Volleyball	7
MAW	Malawi	Volleyball Association of Malawi	6
MRI	Mauritius	Mauritius Volleyball Association	7
MOZ	Mozambique	Federação Moçambicana de Voleibol	6
RWA	Rwanda	Fédération Rwandaise de Volleyball	5
SEY	Seychelles	Seychelles Volleyball Federation	7
SOM	Somalia	Xirrirka Kubadda Laliska	5
SSD	South Sudan	South Sudan Volleyball Federation	5
TAN	Tanzania	Tanzania Volleyball Association	5
UGA	Uganda	Uganda Volleyball Federation	5
ZAM	Zambia	Zambia Volleyball Association	6
ZIM	Zimbabwe	Zimbabwe Volleyball Association	6
Southern Africa
BOT	Botswana	Botswana Volleyball Federation	6
SWZ	Eswatini	Eswatini National Volleyball Association	6
LES	Lesotho	Lesotho National Volleyball Association	6
NAM	Namibia	Namibian Volleyball Federation	6
RSA	South Africa	Volleyball South Africa	6

== FIVB World Rankings ==
FIVB Men's Rankings (as of 1 October 2026)
CAVB*	FIVB	±	National Team	Points
1	29	▼2	Egypt	150.49
2	31	▲10	Tunisia	149.3
3	49	▲6	Cameroon	103.92
4	65	▼2	Kenya	67.9
5	67	▼14	Nigeria	66.41
6	72	▲54	Algeria	62.01
7	86	▲15	Libya	51.08
8	87	▼2	Niger	51.04
9	91	▲8	Senegal	46.93
10	100	▲24	Morocco	38.87
11	108	▲21	South Sudan	27.35
12	109	▲40	Burkina Faso	27.12
13	116	▼47	Benin	20.11
14	119	▲16	Burundi	16.66
15	120	▼50	Zambia	16.41
16	121	▼50	Zimbabwe	15.91
17	130	▼43	Namibia	6.64
18	131	▼38	Cape Verde	4
19	133	▼21	Gambia	3.46
20	136	▼47	Ivory Coast	1
*Local rankings based on FIVB ranking points

FIVB Women's Rankings (as of 2 October 2026)
CAVB*	FIVB	±	National Team	Points
1	24	▼3	Kenya	174.85
2	39	▲26	Egypt	120.89
3	41	▲5	Cameroon	118.87
4	74	▲5	Algeria	51.3
*Local rankings based on FIVB ranking points

== Tournaments ==
=== National team competitions ===
Competition	Year	Champions	Runners-up	Next edition	Most titles
National teams
Men's African Volleyball Championship	2023	Egypt	Algeria	2026	Tunisia (11)
Men's African Volleyball Championship U23	2017	Algeria	Mauritius	TBD	Algeria; Tunisia (1)
Men's African Nations Volleyball Championship U20	2025	Egypt	Cameroon	TBD	Tunisia (11)
Boys's African Nations Volleyball Championship U18	2026	Nigeria	Egypt	TBD	Tunisia (9)
Men's African Beach Volleyball Championships	2026	Morocco	Algeria	TBD	Morocco (5)
National teams (women)
Women's African Volleyball Championship	2023	Kenya	Egypt	2026	Kenya (10)
Women's African Volleyball Championship U23	2016	Egypt	Kenya	TBD	Egypt (2)
Women's African Nations Volleyball Championship U20	2025	Kenya	Cameroon	TBD	Egypt (8)
Girls' African Nations Volleyball Championship U18	2026	Tunisia	Egypt	TBD	Egypt (7)
Women's African Beach Volleyball Championships	2026	Nigeria	Morocco	TBD	Morocco (3)

=== Club competitions ===
- African Clubs Championship
- African Volleyball Cup Winners' Cup
- Women's African Clubs Championship
- Women's African Cup Winners' Cup (volleyball)

=== Beach volleyball competitions ===
- African Beach Volleyball Championships
- Africa Beach Volleyball Championship U19
- Africa Women's Beach Volleyball Championship
- Africa Women's Beach Volleyball Championship U19

=== Zonal competitions ===
- African Zone 1 Volleyball Championship
- African Zone 2 Volleyball Championship
- African Zone 3 Volleyball Championship
- African Zone 4 Volleyball Championship
- African Zone 5 Volleyball Championship
- African Zone 6 Volleyball Championship
- African Zone 7 Volleyball Championship
