= Cameroon men's national volleyball team =

Volleyball team representing Cameroon

Cameroon
- Association: Cameroon Volleyball Federation (FECA)
- Confederation: CAVB
- Head coach: Jean Patrice Ndaki Mboulet
- FIVB ranking: 55 (3 August 2026)

Uniforms
| Home | Away |

World Championship
- Appearances: 6 (First in 1990)
- Best result: 13th (2010)

World Cup
- Appearances: 3 (First in 1989)
- Best result: 8th (1989)

African Championship
- Appearances: 21 (First in 1971)
- Best result: (1989, 2001)
- fecavolley.org
Honours
African Championship
| Gold medal – first place | 1989 Abidjan | Team |
| Gold medal – first place | 2001 Port Harcourt | Team |
| Silver medal – second place | 1987 Tunis | Team |
| Silver medal – second place | 1997 Lagos | Team |
| Silver medal – second place | 2011 Tangier | Team |
| Silver medal – second place | 2019 Tunis | Team |
| Silver medal – second place | 2021 Kigali | Team |
| Bronze medal – third place | 2003 Cairo | Team |
| Bronze medal – third place | 2005 Cairo | Team |
| Bronze medal – third place | 2007 Durban | Team |
| Bronze medal – third place | 2009 Tétouan | Team |
| Bronze medal – third place | 2017 Cairo | Team |
All-Africa Games
| Gold medal – first place | 1987 Nairobi | Team |
| Gold medal – first place | 1999 Johannesburg | Team |
| Gold medal – first place | 2011 Maputo | Team |
| Silver medal – second place | 1995 Harare | Team |
| Bronze medal – third place | 2003 Abuja | Team |

The Cameroon men's national volleyball team represents Cameroon in international volleyball competitions and friendly matches.

== Competition record ==
=== World Cup ===
- (Brazil) 1990 — 15th place
- (Italy) 2010 — 13th place
- (Poland) 2014 — 21st place
- (Italy) (Bulgaria) 2018 — 19th place
- (Poland) (Slovenia) 2022 — 23rd place
- (Philippines) 2025 — Did not qualify
- (Poland) 2027 — Qualified

=== World Cup (1965–2019) ===
- (Japan) 1989 — 8th place

== Team ==
=== Current squad ===
The following is the Cameroonian roster in the 2022 World Championship.

Head coach: (Cameroon) Guy-Roger Nanga

| No. | Name | Date of birth | Height | Weight | Spike | Block | 2022–23 club |
|---|---|---|---|---|---|---|---|
| 1 | Elie Badawe Djakode | 6 January 1996 | 1.90 m (6 ft 3 in) | 100 kg (220 lb) | 330 cm (130 in) | 310 cm (120 in) | (Cameroon) FAP Yaoundé |
| 2 | Ahmed Awal (C) | 2 June 1990 | 1.92 m (6 ft 4 in) | 84 kg (185 lb) | 340 cm (130 in) | 325 cm (128 in) | (France) Calais |
| 3 | Arnaud Amabaya | 6 January 1995 | 1.90 m (6 ft 3 in) | 80 kg (180 lb) | 310 cm (120 in) | 259 cm (102 in) | (Cameroon) PAD Volley |
| 5 | Joseph Kofane Boyomo | 14 September 1988 | 2.06 m (6 ft 9 in) | 95 kg (209 lb) | 360 cm (140 in) | 335 cm (132 in) | (Cameroon) Caudry Volley |
| 6 | Sem Delegombai | 18 May 1990 | 2.00 m (6 ft 7 in) | 95 kg (209 lb) | 350 cm (140 in) | 335 cm (132 in) | (France) Arlésien |
| 8 | Christophe Mandeng Adjessa | 21 May 1999 | 1.98 m (6 ft 6 in) | 80 kg (180 lb) | 350 cm (140 in) | 335 cm (132 in) | (Cameroon) FAP Yaoundé |
| 9 | Cedric Bitouna | 13 September 2000 | 1.87 m (6 ft 2 in) | 75 kg (165 lb) | 310 cm (120 in) | 300 cm (120 in) | (Saudi Arabia) Al Hedaya |
| 10 | Didier Sali Hilé | 9 June 1991 | 1.92 m (6 ft 4 in) | 80 kg (180 lb) | 346 cm (136 in) | 320 cm (130 in) | (France) Amiens |
| 11 | Jeremie Deffo Sobwen | 17 January 2001 | 1.92 m (6 ft 4 in) | 88 kg (194 lb) | 350 cm (140 in) | 330 cm (130 in) | (Cameroon) Bafia Evolution |
| 12 | Kevin Bassoko | 11 December 2002 | 1.83 m (6 ft 0 in) | 76 kg (168 lb) | 330 cm (130 in) | 295 cm (116 in) | (Cameroon) Cameroun Sports |
| 14 | Yaoussi Kavogo | 24 March 2003 | 1.99 m (6 ft 6 in) | 78 kg (172 lb) | 360 cm (140 in) | 355 cm (140 in) | (France) AS Cannes |
| 15 | Yvan Arthur Kody Bitjaa | 25 August 1991 | 2.15 m (7 ft 1 in) | 102 kg (225 lb) | 360 cm (140 in) | 345 cm (136 in) | (Saudi Arabia) Al Khaleej |
| 18 | Nelson Djam | 2 June 1990 | 1.91 m (6 ft 3 in) | 90 kg (200 lb) | 290 cm (110 in) | 270 cm (110 in) | (Cameroon) FAP Yaoundé |
| 20 | Christian Voukeng Mbativou | 6 November 1992 | 2.05 m (6 ft 9 in) | 90 kg (200 lb) | 355 cm (140 in) | 347 cm (137 in) | (Turkey) Afyon Belediyespor |
