= Nigeria men's national volleyball team =

National sports team

Nigeria
- Association: Nigeria Volleyball Federation
- Confederation: CAVB
- Head coach: Usman Abdullahi
- FIVB ranking: NR (5 October 2025)

Uniforms
Home	Away

The Nigeria Men's national volleyball team represents Nigeria in international men's volleyball competitions and friendly matches.

Nigeria qualified for the quarter-final of the 2021 Men's African Nations Volleyball Championship in Rwanda by beating Ethiopia.

== Team achievements ==
The Nigeria Team finished in 7th position at the 2021 African Mens Senior Volleyball Championship in Rwanda.

== Team Players ==
Some of the players that were called up for the 2021 African Mens Senior Volleyball Championship in Rwanda includes;

Setters: Bruno Ibeh and Daniel Nathaniel

Opposite Hitters: Morris Dikiyai, Izuchukwu Nwachukwu and Dauda Saje

Middle Blockers: Philip Akande, Moses Gana and Army Ferdinand

Outside Hitters: Samuel Ogwuche, Matthew Ejeh and Emmanuel Okeke

Libero: Afun Idowu

In 2022, some team players were invited for training in preparation for the national competition. Among them includes Patrick Anthony of Kano Pillars, Vincent Mathias of COAS Spikers, Elisha Anabi of CNS Spiekrs and Princewill Okoi of the Nigeria Customs Service.
