= 2026 Men's European Volleyball Championship Pool D =

International volleyball tournament

Pool D is one of four pools of the preliminary round of the 2026 Men's European Volleyball Championship. The pool consists of the France, Germany, Latvia, co-hosts Romania, Switzerland and Turkey. The matches were played at BTarena in Cluj-Napoca from 9 to 16 September 2026. The top four teams will advance to the final round. The progressing teams were France, Germany, co-hosts Romania and Latvia.

== Teams ==
Team	Qualification method	Date of qualification	Appearance(s)				Previous best performance (Note: Bold text indicates they hosted that edition.)	WR (Note: World ranking at start of tournament.)
Team	Qualification method	Date of qualification	Total	First	Last	Streak	Previous best performance	WR
Romania	Host nation	5 December 2022	19th	1950	2023	2	Champions (1963)	TBD
France	Top eight in 2023	8 September 2023	32nd	1948	2023	15	Champions (2015)	TBD
Germany	Ninth in 2023	26 February 2024	16th	1991	2023	25	Runners-up (2017)	TBD
Turkey	Five best runner-ups	13 August 2025	13th	1958	2023	5	Tenth place (2021)	TBD
Switzerland	Pool E winner	13 August 2025	3rd	1971	2023	2	Nineteenth place (1971)	TBD
Latvia	Five best runner-ups	16 August 2025	3rd	1995	2021	1	Eleventh place (1995)	TBD

== Venue ==
The BTarena will organise matches. The venue was built in 2014 but expanded in preparation for EuroBasket 2017. Romania's largest arena would later host the 2021 Women's European Volleyball Championship. Basketball team, U-BT Cluj-Napoca, plays their home games here.

2026 Men's European Volleyball Championship Pool D is located in Romania	Cluj-Napoca
2026 Men's European Volleyball Championship Pool D is located in Romania	BTarena
2026 Men's European Volleyball Championship Pool D is located in Romania	Capacity: 10,000

== Group standings ==
Pos	Team	Pld	W	L	Pts	SW	SL	SR	SPW	SPL	SPR	Qualification
1	France	5	4	1	13	14	4	3.500	445	370	1.203	Round of 16
2	Germany	5	4	1	11	12	7	1.714	429	408	1.051	Round of 16
3	Romania (H)	5	3	2	9	12	10	1.200	501	486	1.031	Round of 16
4	Latvia	5	2	3	6	8	11	0.727	405	446	0.908	Round of 16
5	Turkey	5	1	4	3	6	12	0.500	392	429	0.914	
6	Switzerland	5	1	4	3	5	13	0.385	396	429	0.923	

Source: CEV
(H) Host

=== Group progression ===
The table listed the results of teams in each round.

Win	Loss

Team ╲ Round	1	2	3	4	5
Romania	L	W	L	W	W
Latvia	W	L	L	L	W
France	W	W	W	W	L
Germany	W	W	W	W	L
Turkey	L	L	W	L	L
Switzerland	L	L	L	L	W

Source: CEV

=== Positions by round ===
The table listed the positions of teams in each round.

Advance to the knockout stage

Team ╲ Round	1	2	3	4	5
Romania	4	3	3	3	3
Latvia	3	4	5	5	4
France	1	2	1	1	1
Germany	2	1	2	2	2
Turkey	5	6	4	4	5
Switzerland	6	5	6	6	6

Source: CEV

== Matches ==
- All times are Eastern European Summer Time (UTC+03:00).

=== Romania vs Latvia ===
9 September 2026; 20:00; Match duration: 2hr 16min	Romania	1–3	Latvia	(Romania) BTarena, Cluj-Napoca; Attendance: 1,750; Referees: Machin Rodriguez (ESP), Vitor Goncalves (POR)
9 September 2026; 20:00; Match duration: 2hr 16min	(24–26, 25–18, 21–25, 24–26); Report			(Romania) BTarena, Cluj-Napoca; Attendance: 1,750; Referees: Machin Rodriguez (ESP), Vitor Goncalves (POR)
9 September 2026; 20:00; Match duration: 2hr 16min	Scoring leaders			(Romania) BTarena, Cluj-Napoca; Attendance: 1,750; Referees: Machin Rodriguez (ESP), Vitor Goncalves (POR)
Rață 21		Total	Šmits 14
Rață (19/45)		Attack	Šmits, Madenis 11
Bălean 3		Block	Freimanis 5
Chiţigoi (2/15)		Serve	Rokjāns (2/7)

=== France vs Switzerland ===
10 September 2026; 17:00; Match duration: 1hr 33min	France	3–0	Switzerland	(Romania) BTarena, Cluj-Napoca; Attendance: 700; Referees: Vitor Alexandre Goncalves (POR), Süleyman Yalcin (NED)
10 September 2026; 17:00; Match duration: 1hr 33min	(25–23, 31–29, 25–21); Report			(Romania) BTarena, Cluj-Napoca; Attendance: 700; Referees: Vitor Alexandre Goncalves (POR), Süleyman Yalcin (NED)
10 September 2026; 17:00; Match duration: 1hr 33min	Scoring leaders			(Romania) BTarena, Cluj-Napoca; Attendance: 700; Referees: Vitor Alexandre Goncalves (POR), Süleyman Yalcin (NED)
Faure 21		Total	Migge 13
Faure (20/36)		Attack	Migge (9/28)
'Seven Players' 1		Block	Hauck 4
Brizard (3/23)		Serve	Migge (3/12)

=== Turkey vs Germany ===
10 September 2026; 20:00; Match duration: 2hr 00min	Turkey	1–3	Germany	(Romania) BTarena, Cluj-Napoca; Attendance: 1,200; Referees: Vlastimil Kovar (CZE), Alexandros Mylonakis (GRE)
10 September 2026; 20:00; Match duration: 2hr 00min	(25–23, 22–25, 21–25, 19–25); Report			(Romania) BTarena, Cluj-Napoca; Attendance: 1,200; Referees: Vlastimil Kovar (CZE), Alexandros Mylonakis (GRE)
10 September 2026; 20:00; Match duration: 2hr 00min	Scoring leaders			(Romania) BTarena, Cluj-Napoca; Attendance: 1,200; Referees: Vlastimil Kovar (CZE), Alexandros Mylonakis (GRE)
Yüksel 16		Total	Mohwinkel 16
Yüksel (15/28)		Attack	Mohwinkel (13/28)
Baltacı 3		Block	Röhrs 2
A. Lagumdžija, Matić 2		Serve	Reichert (3/25)

=== Germany vs Latvia ===
11 September 2026; 17:00; Match duration: 1hr 21min	Germany	3–0	Latvia	(Romania) BTarena, Cluj-Napoca; Attendance: 800; Referees: Alexandros Mylonakis (GRE), Maria de las Olas Rordiguez (SPA)
11 September 2026; 17:00; Match duration: 1hr 21min	(25–20, 25–20, 25–16); Report			(Romania) BTarena, Cluj-Napoca; Attendance: 800; Referees: Alexandros Mylonakis (GRE), Maria de las Olas Rordiguez (SPA)
11 September 2026; 17:00; Match duration: 1hr 21min	Scoring leaders			(Romania) BTarena, Cluj-Napoca; Attendance: 800; Referees: Alexandros Mylonakis (GRE), Maria de las Olas Rordiguez (SPA)
Brehme 11		Total	Smits, Medenis 9
Brehme (10/12)		Attack	Smits, Medenis 8
Krage 2		Block	Freimanis 4
Tille (4/18)		Serve	Medenis (1/7)

=== Switzerland vs Romania ===
11 September 2026; 20:00; Match duration: 1hr 50min	Switzerland	1–3	Romania	(Romania) BTarena, Cluj-Napoca; Attendance: 3,127; Referees: Süleyman Yalcin (NED), Vlastimil Kovar (CZE)
11 September 2026; 20:00; Match duration: 1hr 50min	(21–25, 23–25, 25–13, 20–25); Report			(Romania) BTarena, Cluj-Napoca; Attendance: 3,127; Referees: Süleyman Yalcin (NED), Vlastimil Kovar (CZE)
11 September 2026; 20:00; Match duration: 1hr 50min	Scoring leaders			(Romania) BTarena, Cluj-Napoca; Attendance: 3,127; Referees: Süleyman Yalcin (NED), Vlastimil Kovar (CZE)
Migge, Weisigk 13		Total	Rață 16
Weisigk (12/20)		Attack	Rață (12/24)
Hauck 6		Block	Bartha 5
Migge (3/16)		Serve	Bala, Rață 1

=== France vs Turkey ===
12 September 2026; 17:00; Match duration: 1hr 22min	France	3–0	Turkey	(Romania) BTarena, Cluj-Napoca; Attendance: 1,350; Referees: Vlastimil Kovar (CZE), Vitor Goncalves (POR)
12 September 2026; 17:00; Match duration: 1hr 22min	(25–19, 25–20, 25–19); Report			(Romania) BTarena, Cluj-Napoca; Attendance: 1,350; Referees: Vlastimil Kovar (CZE), Vitor Goncalves (POR)
12 September 2026; 17:00; Match duration: 1hr 22min	Scoring leaders			(Romania) BTarena, Cluj-Napoca; Attendance: 1,350; Referees: Vlastimil Kovar (CZE), Vitor Goncalves (POR)
Faure 16		Total	A. Lagumdžija 16
Faure (15/25)		Attack	A. Lagumdžija (14/32)
'Three players' 1		Block	Baltacı 3
Brizard (2/15)		Serve	A. Lagumdžija (1/10)

=== Romania vs Germany ===
12 September 2026; 20:00; Match duration: 2hr 19min	Romania	2–3	Germany	(Romania) BTarena, Cluj-Napoca; Attendance: 4,382; Referees: Machin Rodriguez (ESP), Alexandros Mylonakis (GRE)
12 September 2026; 20:00; Match duration: 2hr 19min	(22–25, 23–25, 25–22, 25–15, 13–15); Report			(Romania) BTarena, Cluj-Napoca; Attendance: 4,382; Referees: Machin Rodriguez (ESP), Alexandros Mylonakis (GRE)
12 September 2026; 20:00; Match duration: 2hr 19min	Scoring leaders			(Romania) BTarena, Cluj-Napoca; Attendance: 4,382; Referees: Machin Rodriguez (ESP), Alexandros Mylonakis (GRE)
Chiţigoi 21		Total	Röhrs 23
Chiţigoi (15/32)		Attack	Röhrs (22/40)
Bartha 4		Block	Brehme, Krick 3
Chiţigoi, Rață 3		Serve	'Three players' 1

=== Switzerland vs Turkey ===
13 September 2026; 17:00; Match duration: 1hr 27min	Switzerland	0–3	Turkey	(Romania) BTarena, Cluj-Napoca; Attendance: 600; Referees: Vitor Goncalves (POR), Machin Rodriguez (ESP)
13 September 2026; 17:00; Match duration: 1hr 27min	(23–25, 19–25, 19–25); Report			(Romania) BTarena, Cluj-Napoca; Attendance: 600; Referees: Vitor Goncalves (POR), Machin Rodriguez (ESP)
13 September 2026; 17:00; Match duration: 1hr 27min	Scoring leaders			(Romania) BTarena, Cluj-Napoca; Attendance: 600; Referees: Vitor Goncalves (POR), Machin Rodriguez (ESP)
Weisigk 15		Total	Bayram, A. Lagumdžija 17
Weisigk (13/21)		Attack	A. Lagumdžija (15/27)
Migge 1		Block	Tümer 3
Migge, Weisigk 2		Serve	A. Lagumdžija (2/15)

=== Latvia vs France ===
13 September 2026; 20:00; Match duration: 1hr 40min	Latvia	1–3	France	(Romania) BTarena, Cluj-Napoca; Attendance: 650; Referees: Alexandros Mylonakis (GRE), Süleyman Yalcin (NED)
13 September 2026; 20:00; Match duration: 1hr 40min	(12–25, 16–25, 25–22, 13–25); Report			(Romania) BTarena, Cluj-Napoca; Attendance: 650; Referees: Alexandros Mylonakis (GRE), Süleyman Yalcin (NED)
13 September 2026; 20:00; Match duration: 1hr 40min	Scoring leaders			(Romania) BTarena, Cluj-Napoca; Attendance: 650; Referees: Alexandros Mylonakis (GRE), Süleyman Yalcin (NED)
Smits 19		Total	Henno, Magnin 16
Smits (16/36)		Attack	Henno (13/19)
Smits, Freimanis 2		Block	Magnin 9
Smits, Dūdens 1		Serve	Faure (3/15)

=== Germany vs Switzerland ===
14 September 2026; 17:00; Match duration: 1hr 47min	Germany	3−1	Switzerland	(Romania) BTarena, Cluj-Napoca; Attendance: 400; Referees: Süleyman Yalcin (NED), Vitor Alexandre Goncalves (POR)
14 September 2026; 17:00; Match duration: 1hr 47min	(25−19, 25−17, 22−25, 25−21); Report			(Romania) BTarena, Cluj-Napoca; Attendance: 400; Referees: Süleyman Yalcin (NED), Vitor Alexandre Goncalves (POR)
14 September 2026; 17:00; Match duration: 1hr 47min	Scoring leaders			(Romania) BTarena, Cluj-Napoca; Attendance: 400; Referees: Süleyman Yalcin (NED), Vitor Alexandre Goncalves (POR)
Brand 25		Total	Schalch 22
Brand (21/35)		Attack	Schalch (22/42)
Krick 3		Block	Hauck 3
Brand (4/26)		Serve	Egger (1/17)

=== Romania vs Turkey ===
14 September 2026; 20:00; Match duration: 1hr 50min	Romania	3−1	Turkey	(Romania) BTarena, Cluj-Napoca; Attendance: 3,875; Referees: Maria de las Olas Rodriguez (SPA), Vlastimil Kovar (CZE)
14 September 2026; 20:00; Match duration: 1hr 50min	(25−19, 25−21, 20−25, 25−18); Report			(Romania) BTarena, Cluj-Napoca; Attendance: 3,875; Referees: Maria de las Olas Rodriguez (SPA), Vlastimil Kovar (CZE)
14 September 2026; 20:00; Match duration: 1hr 50min	Scoring leaders			(Romania) BTarena, Cluj-Napoca; Attendance: 3,875; Referees: Maria de las Olas Rodriguez (SPA), Vlastimil Kovar (CZE)
Rață 22		Total	Yüksel 17
Rață (21/28)		Attack	Yüksel (15/25)
Bala 3		Block	Matić, Yüksel 2
Chiţigoi, Magdas 2		Serve	Bayram, Gürbüz 1

=== Latvia vs Switzerland ===
15 September 2026; 17:00; Match duration: 1hr 56min	Latvia	1−3	Switzerland	(Romania) BTarena, Cluj-Napoca; Attendance: 400; Referees: Vitor Alexandre Goncalves (POR), Süleyman Yalcin (NED)
15 September 2026; 17:00; Match duration: 1hr 56min	(22−25, 19−25, 25−16, 22−25); Report			(Romania) BTarena, Cluj-Napoca; Attendance: 400; Referees: Vitor Alexandre Goncalves (POR), Süleyman Yalcin (NED)
15 September 2026; 17:00; Match duration: 1hr 56min	Scoring leaders			(Romania) BTarena, Cluj-Napoca; Attendance: 400; Referees: Vitor Alexandre Goncalves (POR), Süleyman Yalcin (NED)
Smits, Jansons 15		Total	Migge 19
Smits (14/32)		Attack	Migge (13/37)
Dūdens 3		Block	Schalch 5
Rokjāns (2/12)		Serve	Migge (3/15)

=== France vs Germany ===
15 September 2026; 20:00; Match duration: 1hr 15min	France	3–0	Germany	(Romania) BTarena, Cluj-Napoca; Attendance: 650; Referees: Alexandros Mylonakis (GRE), Vlastimil Kovar (CZE)
15 September 2026; 20:00; Match duration: 1hr 15min	(25–21, 25–17, 25–19); Report			(Romania) BTarena, Cluj-Napoca; Attendance: 650; Referees: Alexandros Mylonakis (GRE), Vlastimil Kovar (CZE)
15 September 2026; 20:00; Match duration: 1hr 15min	Scoring leaders			(Romania) BTarena, Cluj-Napoca; Attendance: 650; Referees: Alexandros Mylonakis (GRE), Vlastimil Kovar (CZE)
Faure 18		Total	Brehme 11
Faure (15/25)		Attack	Brehme (9/12)
Clevenot 2		Block	Brehme, Reichert 2
Huetz 4		Serve	Tille (1/11)

=== Turkey vs Latvia ===
16 September 2026; 17:00; Match duration: 2hr 00min	Turkey	1–3	Latvia	(Romania) BTarena, Cluj-Napoca; Attendance: 600; Referees: Vlastimil Kovar (CZE), Maria de las Olas Rodriguez (SPA)
16 September 2026; 17:00; Match duration: 2hr 00min	(24–26, 25–23, 24–26, 16–25); Report			(Romania) BTarena, Cluj-Napoca; Attendance: 600; Referees: Vlastimil Kovar (CZE), Maria de las Olas Rodriguez (SPA)
16 September 2026; 17:00; Match duration: 2hr 00min	Scoring leaders			(Romania) BTarena, Cluj-Napoca; Attendance: 600; Referees: Vlastimil Kovar (CZE), Maria de las Olas Rodriguez (SPA)
Gürbüz 30		Total	Smits 23
Gürbüz (26/38)		Attack	Smits (21/30)
Tümer 3		Block	' Three player' 2
Tümer (4/17)		Serve	Jansons (2/20)

=== France vs Romania ===
16 September 2026; 20:00; Match duration: 2hr 20min	France	2–3	Romania	(Romania) BTarena, Cluj-Napoca; Attendance: 5,350; Referees: Süleyman Yalcin (NED), Alexandros Mylonakis (GRE)
16 September 2026; 20:00; Match duration: 2hr 20min	(25–16, 27–25, 20–25, 33–35, 12–15); Report			(Romania) BTarena, Cluj-Napoca; Attendance: 5,350; Referees: Süleyman Yalcin (NED), Alexandros Mylonakis (GRE)
16 September 2026; 20:00; Match duration: 2hr 20min	Scoring leaders			(Romania) BTarena, Cluj-Napoca; Attendance: 5,350; Referees: Süleyman Yalcin (NED), Alexandros Mylonakis (GRE)
Boyer 21		Total	Chiţigoi 28
Henno (18/32)		Attack	Chiţigoi (24/37)
Gueye 3		Block	Bartha, Chiţigoi 3
Boyer (3/20)		Serve	'Four players' 1
