= Brazil at the 2028 Summer Olympics =

- IOC code: BRA
- NOC: Brazilian Olympic Committee
- Website: www.cob.org.br (in Portuguese)

in Los Angeles, United States 14 July 2028 – 30 July 2028
- Competitors: 51 in 3 sports
- Medals: Gold 0 Silver 0 Bronze 0 Total 0

Summer Olympics appearances (overview)
- 1920; 1924; 1928; 1932; 1936; 1948; 1952; 1956; 1960; 1964; 1968; 1972; 1976; 1980; 1984; 1988; 1992; 1996; 2000; 2004; 2008; 2012; 2016; 2020; 2024; 2028

Brazil is set to compete at the 2028 Summer Olympics in Los Angeles from 14 to 30 July 2028, thereby marking the continuation of its Olympic participation dating back to 1920, with the sole exception of the 1928.

== Competitors ==
The following is the list of number of competitors in the Games.

Sport	Men	Women	Total
Football	0	18	18
Gymnastics	0	5	5
Volleyball	14	14	28
Total	14	37	51

== Football ==
Summary

Key:

- A.E.T – After extra time.
- P – Match decided by penalty-shootout.

Team	Event	Group Stage				Quarterfinal	Semifinal	Final / BM	
Team	Event	Opposition Score	Opposition Score	Opposition Score	Rank	Opposition Score	Opposition Score	Opposition Score	Rank
Brazil	Women's tournament								

=== Women's tournament ===
Brazil qualified a team of 18 athletes after winning the 2025 Copa América Femenina.

Team roster

Group play

== Gymnastics ==
=== Rhythmic ===
Brazil secured qualification for a group squad after winning the bronze medal at the 2026 Rhythmic Gymnastics World Championships in Frankfurt, Germany, thereby securing one of the three available qualification quotas.

Athletes	Event	Qualification				Final			
Athletes	Event	5 apps	3+2 apps	Total	Rank	5 apps	3+2 apps	Total	Rank
	Group								

== Volleyball ==
=== Indoor ===
Brazil men's and women's teams secured qualification for the Games by winning the competition and claiming the direct South American qualification at the 2026 Men's South American Volleyball Championship in Rio de Janeiro.

Team	Event	Group stage				Quarterfinal	Semifinal	Final / BM	
Team	Event	Opposition Score	Opposition Score	Opposition Score	Rank	Opposition Score	Opposition Score	Opposition Score	Rank
Brazil men's	Men's tournament								
Brazil women's	Women's tournament								

=== Beach ===
Brazil men's and women's pairs qualified for the Los Angeles Olympic Games after winning the gold medal and securing each men's & women's pairs quotas at the 2026 South American Beach Volleyball Championships in João Pessoa, Brazil.

Athletes	Event	Preliminary round				Round of 16	Quarterfinal	Semifinal	Final / BM	
Athletes	Event	Opposition Score	Opposition Score	Opposition Score	Rank	Opposition Score	Opposition Score	Opposition Score	Opposition Score	Rank
	Men's									
	Women's									
