= Volleyball at the 2028 Summer Olympics =

Volleyball at the Games of the XXXIV Olympiad
- Venue: Honda Center (indoor); Alamitos Beach (beach)
- Dates: 15 – 30 July 2028
- No. of events: 4 (2 men, 2 women)

The volleyball tournaments at the 2028 Summer Olympics in Los Angeles will be held from 15 to 30 July 2028. 24 volleyball teams and 48 beach volleyball teams will participate in the tournament. Indoor volleyball competitions will occur at Honda Center with the beach volleyball tournament staged at Alamitos Beach.

== Qualification summary ==
=== Indoor volleyball ===
On 11 December 2025, Fédération Internationale de Volleyball announced the qualification system for the volleyball tournaments at the 2028 Summer Olympics. The host nation, the United States, automatically qualified for both the men's and women's tournaments. The champions of the five continental championships in each gender, scheduled for 2026, will also qualify directly. An additional three places per gender will be awarded to the highest-placed teams not yet qualified at the 2027 FIVB Volleyball World Championships, which will be held under the rebranded FIVB Volleyball World Cup name. The remaining three places in each tournament will be allocated according to the FIVB World Ranking following the conclusion of the preliminary round of the 2028 FIVB Volleyball Nations League.

==== Men's volleyball ====
Qualification	Date	Venue	Berths	Qualified team
Host nation	—N/a		1	United States
2026 AVC Men's Volleyball Continental Championship	4–13 September 2026	(Japan) Fukuoka	1	Japan
2026 Men's NORCECA Volleyball Championship	11–19 September 2026	(Canada) Moncton	1	Cuba
2026 Men's South American Volleyball Championship	15–20 September 2026	(Brazil) Rio de Janeiro	1	Brazil
2026 Men's African Nations Volleyball Championship	15–25 September 2026	(Tunisia) Tunis	1	Tunisia
2026 Men's European Volleyball Championship	9–26 September 2026	(Italy) Milan	1	Poland
2027 FIVB Men's Volleyball World Cup	10–26 September 2027	Poland	3	
World Ranking	June 11, 2028	—N/a	3	
Total			12	

==== Women's volleyball ====
Qualification	Date	Venue	Berths	Qualified team
Host nation	—N/a		1	United States
2026 Women's NORCECA Volleyball Championship	21–29 August 2026	(Dominican Republic) Santo Domingo	1	Canada
2026 AVC Women's Volleyball Continental Championship	21–30 August 2026	(China) Tianjin	1	Thailand
2026 Women's African Nations Volleyball Championship	25 August – 4 September 2026	(Kenya) Nairobi	1	Egypt
2026 Women's European Volleyball Championship	21 August – 6 September 2026	(Turkey) Istanbul	1	Turkey
2026 Women's South American Volleyball Championship	8–13 September 2026	(Brazil) Rio de Janeiro	1	Brazil
2027 FIVB Women's Volleyball World Cup	20 August – 5 September 2027	Canada; United States	3	
World Ranking	June 11, 2028	—N/a	3	
Total			12	

=== Beach volleyball ===
On 11 December 2025, the Fédération Internationale de Volleyball (FIVB) announced the qualification system for the beach volleyball tournaments at the 2028 Summer Olympics. A total of 24 teams per gender will compete. The host nation, the United States, is guaranteed one berth in each tournament. The champions of the five continental championships in 2026 will qualify directly, while the winners of the 2027 FIVB Beach Volleyball World Championships will also secure Olympic berths. The remaining places will be allocated through the Olympic Ranking and the Olympic Qualifier Series.

==== Men's beach volleyball ====
Qualification	Date	Host	Berths	Qualified NOC
Host nation	—N/a		1	United States
2026 CEV EuroBeachVolley	12–16 August 2026	(Poland) Stare Jabłonki	1	Sweden
2026 African Beach Volleyball Championships	18–22 August 2026	(Egypt) Alexandria	1	Morocco
2026 Asian Beach Volleyball Championships	2–6 September 2026	(China) Shangluo	1	Australia
2026 CSV Championship	3–6 September 2026	(Brazil) João Pessoa	1	Brazil
2026 NORCECA Beach Volleyball Championships	4–9 November 2026	Vega Baja	1	United States
2027 FIVB Beach Volleyball World Championships	August 13-22, 2027	Netherlands	1	
FIVB Beach Volleyball Olympic Ranking	March 31, 2028	-	14	
Olympic Qualifier Series	11–14 May 2028; 1–4 June 2028; 8–11 June 2028	(China) Shanghai (Canada) Montreal (United States) Orlando	3	
Total			24	

==== Women's beach volleyball ====
Qualification	Date	Host	Berths	Qualified NOC
Host nation	—N/a		1	United States
2026 CEV EuroBeachVolley	12–16 August 2026	(Poland) Stare Jabłonki	1	Netherlands
2026 African Beach Volleyball Championships	18–22 August 2026	(Egypt) Alexandria	1	Nigeria
2026 Asian Beach Volleyball Championships	2–6 September 2026	(China) Shangluo	1	Australia
2026 CSV Championship	3–6 September 2026	(Brazil) João Pessoa	1	Brazil
2026 NORCECA Beach Volleyball Championships	4–9 November 2026	Vega Baja	1	Canada
2027 FIVB Beach Volleyball World Championships	August 13-22, 2027	Netherlands	1	
FIVB Beach Volleyball Olympic Ranking	March 31, 2028	-	14	
Olympic Qualifier Series	11–14 May 2028; 1–4 June 2028; 8–11 June 2028	(China) Shanghai (Canada) Montreal (United States) Orlando	3	
Total			24	
