= 2026 Men's African Nations Volleyball Championship =

African men's volleyball championships

بطولة إفريقيا للأمم للكرة الطائرة للرجال 2026 (Arabic); Championnat d'Afrique Masculin de Volley-ball 2026 (French)

Tournament details
- Host country: Tunisia
- City: Tunis
- Dates: 15–25 September
- Teams: 13 (from 1 confederation)
- Venue: 1 (in 1 host city)

Final positions
- Champions: Tunisia (12th title)
- Runners-up: Cameroon
- Third place: Algeria
- Fourth place: Morocco

Tournament awards
- MVP: (Tunisia) Oussama Ben Romdhane
- Best Setter: (Tunisia) Khaled Ben Slimene
- Best OH: (Cameroon) Elie Badawe Djakode; (Algeria) Farouk Tizit
- Best MB: (Cameroon) Christian Voukeng Mbativou; (Cameroon) William Darrel Tanga
- Best OPP: (Morocco) Mourad Bahid
- Best Libero: (Tunisia) Tayeb Korbosli

Tournament statistics
- Matches played: 37
- Attendance: 2,810 (76 per match)

The 2026 Men's African Nations Volleyball Championship was the 25th edition of the Men's African Nations Volleyball Championship, a biennial international volleyball tournament organised by the African Volleyball Confederation (CAVB) for national men's volleyball teams in Africa. The tournament took place from 15 to 25 September. It was originally supposed to be held in Kinshasa, DR Congo but due to the Ebola epidemic in the country, the tournament was moved to Tunisia.

For the first time, a qualification took place and was held between June and July 2026. Central African Republic make their debut. After FIVB's calendar changes starting 2025, this was the first Championship since 1976 to be held in an even-numbered year. Egypt was the defending champion, but they were eliminated in the quarter-finals by Algeria, whom they defeated 3–1 in the 2023 final in Cairo.

Tunisia won a record-extending 12th title by defeating Cameroon 3–0 in the final, and thus qualified for the 2028 Summer Olympics. They, along with Algeria who placed third after defeating Morocco 3–0, also qualified for the 2027 FIVB World Cup as the top three teams.

== Year change ==
On 22 June 2023, the Fédération Internationale de Volleyball (FIVB) announced a comprehensive restructuring of the international calendar for the 2025–2028 cycle. As part of this overhaul, continental championships shifted from odd-numbered years to even-numbered years, beginning in 2026. The structural change was implemented to prioritize athlete health and recovery by reducing calendar congestion, as well as to streamline the qualification pathways for major global tournaments such as the FIVB World Cup and the Olympic Games.

== Host selection ==
On 29 December 2025, the African Volleyball Confederation announced that the 25th edition of the Men's African Nations Volleyball Championship would be held in Kinshasa, DR of Congo from 5 to 15 September 2026.

On 16 August 2026, the Tunisian Volleyball Federation announced, based on the decision of the Executive Committee of the African Volleyball Confederation that the tournament would be moved to Tunisia due to the Ebola outbreak in DR Congo, and the tournament dates were changed from 15 to 25 September 2026. This is the seventh time that Tunisia has hosted the tournament after 1967, 1976, 1987, 1995, 2013 and 2019.

== Teams ==
Initially, 27 teams entered the competition. However, due to the amount of teams entering, the CAVB asked each region to organise qualifiers to narrow the volume of teams to 16. Of the 16 qualified teams, 12 were present at the previous edition. Central African Republic made their debut. Of the returnees, DR Congo and Nigeria return after not appearing in 2023. Libya withdrew from the competition due to financial difficulties and a lack of preparation. Numbers in brackets indicate their ranking before the tournament.

=== Qualified teams ===
Qualification	Host	Dates	Vacancies	Qualified
Original hosts		January 2026	1	DR Congo
Top ten in 2023	(Egypt) Cairo	3–13 September 2023	10	Egypt; Algeria; ~~Libya~~; Cameroon; Tunisia; Rwanda; Chad; Morocco; Kenya; Ghana
Zone 2 qualifier	(The Gambia) Banjul	18–20 June 2026	1	Gambia
Zone 3 qualifier	(Ivory Coast) Abidjan	14–18 July 2026	1	Nigeria
Zone 4 qualifier	(Central African Republic) Bangui	22–26 June 2026	1	Central African Republic
Zone 5 qualifier	(Uganda) Kampala	1–5 June 2026	1	~~Uganda~~
Zone 6 qualifier	(Zimbabwe) Harare	10–13 June 2026	1	~~Zimbabwe~~

=== Draw results ===
Pool A
Pos	Team
A1	Ghana
A2	Kenya
A3	Tunisia

Pool B
Pos	Team
B1	Egypt
B2	Gambia
B3	Morocco

Pool C
Pos	Team
C1	Algeria
C2	Chad
C3	Nigeria

Pool D
Pos	Team
D1	Central African Republic
D2	Cameroon
D3	DR Congo
D4	Rwanda

== Venue ==
The El Menzah Sports Palace hosted all the championship matches; this marks the sixeth time the venue has hosted the tournament, following the 1967, 1976, 1987, 1995 and 2019 editions.

Tunis	Tunis (Tunisia)
El Menzah Sports Palace	Tunis (Tunisia)
Capacity: 6,000	Tunis (Tunisia)

== Format ==
The teams were drawn into four groups, three with four teams and one with three. The group stage is used for seeding as every team advances to the round of 16 where it is a straight knockout from then on.

- Match won 3–0 or 3–1: 3 match points for the winner, 0 match points for the loser
- Match won 3–2: 2 match points for the winner, 1 match point for the loser

=== Tiebreakers ===
1. Number of matches won
2. Match points
3. Sets ratio
4. Points ratio
5. If the tie continues as per the point ratio between two teams, the priority will be given to the team which won the match between them. When the tie in points ratio is between three or more teams, a new classification of these teams in the terms of points 1, 2, 3 and 4 will be made taking into consideration only the matches in which they were opposed to each other.

== Preliminary round ==
- All times are West Africa Time (UTC+01:00).

=== Pool A ===
Pos	Team	Pld	W	L	Pts	SW	SL	SR	SPW	SPL	SPR	Qualification
1	Tunisia (H)	2	2	0	6	6	0	MAX	150	114	1.316	Quarterfinals
2	Ghana	2	1	1	3	3	3	1.000	135	138	0.978	Round of 10
3	Kenya	2	0	2	0	0	6	0.000	117	150	0.780	Round of 10

Updated to match(es) played on 16 September 2026. Source: FIVB Live Center
(H) Host

Date	Time		Score		Set 1	Set 2	Set 3	Set 4	Set 5	Total	Attd	Report
15 Sep	18:30	Ghana	0–3	Tunisia	17–25	21–25	22–25			60–75	100	P2 Report
16 Sep	18:00	Tunisia	3–0	Kenya	25–15	25–23	25–16			75–54	110	P2 Report
17 Sep	12:00	Kenya	0–3	Ghana	20–25	23–25	20–25			63–75	65	P2 Report

=== Pool B ===
Pos	Team	Pld	W	L	Pts	SW	SL	SR	SPW	SPL	SPR	Qualification
1	Egypt	2	2	0	6	6	1	6.000	176	143	1.231	Round of 10
2	Morocco	2	1	1	3	3	4	0.750	155	156	0.994	Round of 10
3	Gambia	2	0	2	0	2	6	0.333	164	196	0.837	Round of 10

Updated to match(es) played on 16 September 2026. Source: FIVB Live Center

Date	Time		Score		Set 1	Set 2	Set 3	Set 4	Set 5	Total	Attd	Report
15 Sep	09:00	Egypt	3–1	Gambia	26–28	25–18	25–15	25–22		101–83	50	P2 Report
16 Sep	15:00	Gambia	1–3	Morocco	22–25	25–20	18–25	16–25		81–95		P2 Report
17 Sep	18:00	Morocco	0–3	Egypt	21–25	18–25	21–25			60–75	30	P2 Report

=== Pool C ===
Pos	Team	Pld	W	L	Pts	SW	SL	SR	SPW	SPL	SPR	Qualification
1	Nigeria	2	2	0	5	6	2	3.000	184	151	1.219	Quarterfinals
2	Algeria	2	1	1	4	5	3	1.667	176	160	1.100	Round of 10
3	Chad	2	0	2	0	0	6	0.000	101	150	0.673	Round of 10

Updated to match(es) played on 16 September 2026. Source: FIVB Live Center

Date	Time		Score		Set 1	Set 2	Set 3	Set 4	Set 5	Total	Attd	Report
15 Sep	12:00	Algeria	3–0	Chad	25–13	25–22	25–16			75–51	50	P2 Report
16 Sep	09:00	Chad	0–3	Nigeria	17–25	17–25	16–25			50–75		P2 Report
17 Sep	09:00	Nigeria	3–2	Algeria	23–25	25–19	21–25	25–20	15–12	109–101	60	P2 Report

=== Pool D ===
Pos	Team	Pld	W	L	Pts	SW	SL	SR	SPW	SPL	SPR	Qualification
1	Cameroon	3	3	0	9	9	1	9.000	243	180	1.350	Quarterfinals
2	Rwanda	3	2	1	6	7	4	1.750	259	218	1.188	Round of 10
3	DR Congo	3	1	2	3	4	6	0.667	213	226	0.942	Round of 10
4	Central African Republic	3	0	3	0	0	9	0.000	135	226	0.597	Round of 10

Updated to match(es) played on 16 September 2026. Source: FIVB Live Center

Date	Time		Score		Set 1	Set 2	Set 3	Set 4	Set 5	Total	Attd	Report
15 Sep	15:00	DR Congo	0–3	Cameroon	12–25	21–25	16–25			49–75		P2 Report
15 Sep	21:00	Rwanda	3–0	Central African Republic	25–14	25–9	25–14			75–37	20	P2 Report
16 Sep	12:00	Rwanda	3–1	DR Congo	25–22	21–25	25–21	25–20		96–88	20	P2 Report
16 Sep	21:00	Central African Republic	0–3	Cameroon	15–25	11–25	17–25			43–75	50	P2 Report
17 Sep	15:00	Central African Republic	0–3	DR Congo	21–25	24–26	10–25			55–76	60	P2 Report
17 Sep	21:00	Cameroon	3–1	Rwanda	18–25	25–21	25–23	25–19		93–88		P2 Report

== Final round ==
- All times are West Africa Time (UTC+01:00).

Round of 16
Tunisia	W
bye
19 September
Rwanda	3
Gambia	0
Nigeria	W
bye
19 September
Morocco	3
DR Congo	0
Cameroon	W
bye
19 September
Ghana	3
Chad	0
20 September
Egypt	3
Central African Republic	0
20 September
Algeria	3
Kenya	1

Quarterfinals
21 September
Tunisia	3
Rwanda	0
21 September
Nigeria	2
Morocco	3
21 September
Cameroon	3
Ghana	2
21 September
Egypt	2
Algeria	3

Semifinals
23 September
Tunisia	3
Morocco	1
23 September
Cameroon	3
Algeria	1

Final
25 September
Tunisia	3
Cameroon	0
Third place match
25 September
Morocco	0
Algeria	3

5th–8th semifinals
23 September
Rwanda	3
Nigeria	1
23 September
Ghana	2
Egypt	3

Fifth place match
24 September
Rwanda	0
Egypt	3
Seventh place match
24 September
Nigeria	0
Ghana	3

9th–13th quarterfinals
Gambia	W
bye
DR Congo	W
bye
Chad	W
bye
21 September
Central African Republic	0
Kenya	3

9th–12th semifinals
20 September
Gambia	0
DR Congo	3
23 September
Chad	0
Kenya	3

Ninth place match
24 September
DR Congo	1
Kenya	3
11th place match
24 September
Gambia	2
Chad	3

=== Round of 16 ===
Date	Time		Score		Set 1	Set 2	Set 3	Set 4	Set 5	Total	Attd	Report
19 Sep	12:00	Rwanda	3–0	Gambia	25–18	25–21	25–18			75–57	60	P2 Report
19 Sep	15:00	Ghana	3–0	Chad	25–19	25–13	25–15			75–47	60	P2 Report
19 Sep	18:00	Morocco	3–0	DR Congo	25–20	25–21	29–27			79–68		Report
20 Sep	15:00	Egypt	3–0	Central African Republic	25–8	25–11	25–12			75–31	100	P2 Report
20 Sep	18:00	Algeria	3–1	Kenya	25–21	21–25	25–19	25–16		96–81	40	P2 Report

=== 9th–13th quarterfinals ===
Date	Time		Score		Set 1	Set 2	Set 3	Set 4	Set 5	Total	Attd	Report
21 Sep	15:00	Central African Republic	0–3	Kenya	18–25	14–25	10–25			42–75		Report

=== Quarterfinals ===
Date	Time		Score		Set 1	Set 2	Set 3	Set 4	Set 5	Total	Attd	Report
21 Sep	12:00	Cameroon	3–2	Ghana	25–21	19–25	23–25	25–23	16–14	108–108		P2 Report
21 Sep	15:00	Egypt	2–3	Algeria	17–25	25–20	25–19	23–25	13–15	103–104		P2 Report
21 Sep	18:00	Tunisia	3–0	Rwanda	25–13	25–18	25–18			75–49	350	P2 Report
21 Sep	21:00	Nigeria	2–3	Morocco	25–20	15–25	21–25	26–24	12–15	99–109	20	P2 Report

=== 9th–12th semifinals ===
Date	Time		Score		Set 1	Set 2	Set 3	Set 4	Set 5	Total	Attd	Report
20 Sep	12:00	Gambia	0–3	DR Congo	20–25	30–32	16–25			66–82		Report
23 Sep	09:00	Chad	0–3	Kenya	19–25	15–25	23–25			57–75		Report

=== 5th–8th semifinals ===
Date	Time		Score		Set 1	Set 2	Set 3	Set 4	Set 5	Total	Attd	Report
23 Sep	12:00	Rwanda	3–1	Nigeria	25–23	25–20	18–25	25–19		93–87	60	P2 Report
23 Sep	15:00	Ghana	2–3	Egypt	21–25	25–22	20–25	25–21	9–15	100–108	100	P2 Report

=== Semifinals ===
Date	Time		Score		Set 1	Set 2	Set 3	Set 4	Set 5	Total	Attd	Report
23 Sep	18:00	Tunisia	3–1	Morocco	25–17	20–25	25–16	25–12		95–70	900	P2 Report
23 Sep	21:00	Cameroon	3–1	Algeria	25–22	25–16	20–25	25–23		95–86	200	P2 Report

=== 11th place match ===
Date	Time		Score		Set 1	Set 2	Set 3	Set 4	Set 5	Total	Attd	Report
24 Sep	12:00	Gambia	2–3	Chad	20–25	26–24	25–23	18–25	11–15	100–112		Report

=== Ninth place match ===
Date	Time		Score		Set 1	Set 2	Set 3	Set 4	Set 5	Total	Attd	Report
24 Sep	15:00	DR Congo	1–3	Kenya	26–24	25–27	17–25	23–25		91–101	30	P2 Report

=== Seventh place match ===
Date	Time		Score		Set 1	Set 2	Set 3	Set 4	Set 5	Total	Attd	Report
24 Sep	18:00	Nigeria	0–3	Ghana	22–25	25–27	16–25			63–77	30	P2 Report

=== Fifth place match ===
Date	Time		Score		Set 1	Set 2	Set 3	Set 4	Set 5	Total	Attd	Report
24 Sep	21:00	Rwanda	0–3	Egypt	16–25	21–25	24–26			61–76	45	P2 Report

=== Third place match ===
Date	Time		Score		Set 1	Set 2	Set 3	Set 4	Set 5	Total	Attd	Report
25 Sep	14:30	Morocco	0–3	Algeria	19–25	21–25	18–25			58–75	200	P2 Report

=== Final ===
Date	Time		Score		Set 1	Set 2	Set 3	Set 4	Set 5	Total	Attd	Report
25 Sep	17:00	Tunisia	3–0	Cameroon	25–22	25–18	25–19			75–59		Report

== Final standing ==
Pos	Team	Pld	W	L	Pts	SW	SL	SR	SPW	SPL	SPR	Qualification
1st place, gold medalist(s)	Tunisia (H)	5	5	0	15	15	1	15.000	395	292	1.353	Qualified for the 2027 World Cup, 2028 Summer Olympics, and 2028 African Championship
2nd place, silver medalist(s)	Cameroon	6	5	1	14	15	7	2.143	505	449	1.125	Qualified for the 2027 World Cup
3rd place, bronze medalist(s)	Algeria	6	4	2	12	15	9	1.667	537	497	1.080	Qualified for the 2027 World Cup
4	Morocco	6	3	3	8	10	12	0.833	471	493	0.955	
5	Egypt	6	5	1	15	17	6	2.833	538	439	1.226	
6	Rwanda	7	4	3	12	13	11	1.182	537	513	1.047	
7	Ghana	6	3	3	11	13	9	1.444	495	464	1.067	
8	Nigeria	5	2	3	6	9	11	0.818	433	430	1.007	
9	Kenya	6	3	3	9	10	10	1.000	449	436	1.030	
10	DR Congo	5	2	3	6	8	9	0.889	454	472	0.962	
11	Chad	5	1	4	2	3	14	0.214	317	400	0.793	
12	Gambia	5	0	5	1	4	15	0.267	387	465	0.832	
13	Central African Republic	5	0	5	0	0	15	0.000	208	376	0.553	

(H) Host

== Awards ==
2026 Men's African Nations Volleyball champions

Tunisia
12th title

The following awards were given at the conclusion of the tournament:

- Most valuable player
  (Tunisia) Oussama Ben Romdhane
- Best setter
  (Tunisia) Khaled Ben Slimene
- Best outside hitters
  (Cameroon) Elie Badawe Djakode
  (Algeria) Farouk Tizit
- Best middle blockers
  (Cameroon) Christian Voukeng Mbativou
  (Cameroon) William Darrel Tanga Mvilongo
- Best opposite spiker
  (Morocco) Bahid Mourad
- Best libero
  (Tunisia) Tayeb Korbosli

== Statistics ==
=== Top 5 Scorers ===
Rank	Name	Points
1	(Rwanda) Dusenge Wicklif	138
2	(Ghana) Abdul-Hameed Ibrahim	113
3	(Algeria) Farouk Tizit	96
4	(Ghana) Imoro Iddi Alhassan	92
5	(Nigeria) Ezeofor Amstrong Udoka	87

== See also ==
- 2026 AVC Men's Volleyball Continental Championship
- 2026 Men's NORCECA Volleyball Championship
- 2026 Men's European Volleyball Championship
- 2026 Men's South American Volleyball Championship
- 2026 Women's African Nations Volleyball Championship
