= 2026 Men's NORCECA Volleyball Championship =

North American men's volleyball tournament

Championnat continental de volleyball masculin de la NORCECA 2026 (French)

Tournament details
- Host country: Canada
- City: Moncton
- Dates: 11–16 September
- Teams: 8 (from 1 confederation)
- Venue: 1 (in 1 host city)

Final positions
- Champions: United States (11th title)
- Runners-up: Canada
- Third place: Cuba
- Fourth place: Dominican Republic

Tournament awards
- MVP: (United States) Erik Shoji

Tournament statistics
- Matches played: 22
- Attendance: 17,309 (787 per match)

The 2026 Men's NORCECA Volleyball Championship was the 29th edition of the Men's NORCECA Volleyball Championship, a biennial international volleyball tournament organised by the North, Central America and Caribbean Volleyball Confederation (NORCECA) for national men's volleyball teams in North America, Central America and the Caribbean. The tournament took place from September 11 to 16. Moncton, New Brunswick, Canada hosted the tournament, which was the sixth time a Canadian city has hosted the championships, after 1991, 1995, 2005, 2013 and 2019.

The United States won the tournament by defeating Canada in the final, 3-2. That was a successful defense of the title the US won in 2023, when they also defeated Canada in the final, 3-0, in Charleston, West Virginia. In the 3rd place match, Cuba defeated the Dominican Republic, 3-0. The USA, Canada and Cuba qualified for the 2027 FIVB Men's Volleyball World Cup based on these results.

Immediately after the championship was decided, the top four teams (except the United States) - Canada, Cuba, Dominican Republic and Mexico - played off in a separate tournament to determine the continental qualifier for the 2028 Summer Olympics. (the US has already qualified for the 2028 Summer Olympics as the host nation). In the playoff final, Cuba defeated Canada, 3-2, thereby qualifying for the Summer Olympics for the first time since 2016.

== Year change ==
On June 22, 2023, the Fédération Internationale de Volleyball (FIVB) announced a comprehensive restructuring of the international calendar for the 2025–2028 cycle. As part of this overhaul, continental championships shifted from odd-numbered years to even-numbered years, beginning in 2026. The structural change was implemented to prioritize athlete health and recovery by reducing calendar congestion, as well as to streamline the qualification pathways for major global tournaments such as the FIVB World Cup and the Olympic Games.

== Teams ==
Eight teams competed in Moncton, including six of the seven teams from the last championships in 2023. Suriname competed in 2023, but not 2026, while Curaçao made their debut, and Guatemala competed for the first time since 2021. Brackets indicate their world ranking before the tournament.

- Canada ^{H} (19th)
- Curaçao (64th)
- Cuba (15th)
- Dominican Republic (48th)
- Guatemala (98th)
- Mexico (25th)
- Puerto Rico (22nd)
- United States (5th)

== Pools composition ==
| Pool A | Pool B |
|---|---|
| Canada (H) | United States |
| Puerto Rico | Cuba |
| Mexico | Dominican Republic |
| Curaçao | Guatemala |

== Schedule ==
Schedule
| Round | Matchday | Date |
|---|---|---|
| Preliminary round | All matches | 11–13 September 2026 |
Knockout stage
| Knockout stage | Quarterfinals | 14 September 2026 |
| Knockout stage | Semifinals | 15 September 2026 |
| Knockout stage | Placement matches & final | 16 September 2026 |

== Venue ==
All games are being played at the Avenir Centre, in Moncton, Canada.

| 2026 Men's NORCECA Volleyball Championship is located in Canada | Moncton |
|---|---|
| 2026 Men's NORCECA Volleyball Championship is located in Canada | Avenir Centre |
| 2026 Men's NORCECA Volleyball Championship is located in Canada | Capacity: 8,800 |

== Format ==
The teams were drawn into two groups of four. The group winners advance directly to the semifinals. The second and third-placed teams from both groups advance to the quarterfinals. The bottom teams are dropped into the 5th-8th place semifinals.

== Preliminary round ==
- All times are Atlantic Time (UTC-04:00).
- Match won 3–0 or 3–1: 3 match points for the winner, 0 match points for the loser
- Match won 3–2: 2 match points for the winner, 1 match point for the loser

=== Tiebreakers ===
1. Number of matches won
2. Match points
3. Sets ratio
4. Points ratio
5. If the tie continues as per the point ratio between two teams, the priority will be given to the team which won the match between them. When the tie in points ratio is between three or more teams, a new classification of these teams in the terms of points 1, 2, 3 and 4 will be made taking into consideration only the matches in which they were opposed to each other.

=== Pool A ===
| Pos | Team | Pld | W | L | Pts | SW | SL | SR | SPW | SPL | SPR | Qualification |
|---|---|---|---|---|---|---|---|---|---|---|---|---|
| 1 | Canada (H) | 3 | 3 | 0 | 9 | 9 | 0 | MAX | 225 | 152 | 1.480 | Semifinals |
| 2 | Mexico | 3 | 2 | 1 | 6 | 6 | 4 | 1.500 | 218 | 217 | 1.005 | Quarterfinals |
| 3 | Puerto Rico | 3 | 1 | 2 | 3 | 4 | 6 | 0.667 | 218 | 228 | 0.956 | Quarterfinals |
| 4 | Curaçao | 3 | 0 | 3 | 0 | 0 | 9 | 0.000 | 161 | 225 | 0.716 | 5th-8th Semifinals |

Source: FIVB Live Center
(H) Host

| Date | Time | | Score | | Set 1 | Set 2 | Set 3 | Set 4 | Set 5 | Total | Attd | Report |
|---|---|---|---|---|---|---|---|---|---|---|---|---|
| Sep 11 | 13:30 | Mexico | 3–1 | Puerto Rico | 26–24 | 14–25 | 25–18 | 25–23 | | 90–90 | 289 | P2 Report |
| Sep 11 | 19:00 | Canada | 3–0 | Curaçao | 25–12 | 25–20 | 25–14 | | | 75–46 | 520 | P2 Report |
| Sep 12 | 13:30 | Mexico | 3–0 | Curaçao | 25–12 | 25–22 | 25–18 | | | 75–52 | 800 | P2 Report |
| Sep 12 | 19:00 | Canada | 3–0 | Puerto Rico | 25–19 | 25–17 | 25–17 | | | 75–53 | 2,041 | P2 Report |
| Sep 13 | 13:00 | Puerto Rico | 3–0 | Curaçao | 25–18 | 25–22 | 25–23 | | | 75–63 | 500 | P2 Report |
| Sep 13 | 19:00 | Canada | 3–0 | Mexico | 25–15 | 25–18 | 25–20 | | | 75–53 | 2,000 | P2 Report |

=== Pool B ===
| Pos | Team | Pld | W | L | Pts | SW | SL | SR | SPW | SPL | SPR | Qualification |
|---|---|---|---|---|---|---|---|---|---|---|---|---|
| 1 | United States | 3 | 3 | 0 | 9 | 9 | 1 | 9.000 | 244 | 168 | 1.452 | Semifinals |
| 2 | Cuba | 3 | 2 | 1 | 6 | 7 | 3 | 2.333 | 230 | 185 | 1.243 | Quarterfinals |
| 3 | Dominican Republic | 3 | 1 | 2 | 3 | 3 | 6 | 0.500 | 180 | 204 | 0.882 | Quarterfinals |
| 4 | Guatemala | 3 | 0 | 3 | 0 | 0 | 9 | 0.000 | 128 | 225 | 0.569 | 5th-8th Semifinals |

Source: FIVB Live Center

| Date | Time | | Score | | Set 1 | Set 2 | Set 3 | Set 4 | Set 5 | Total | Attd | Report |
|---|---|---|---|---|---|---|---|---|---|---|---|---|
| Sep 11 | 11:00 | United States | 3–0 | Guatemala | 25–13 | 25–13 | 25–11 | | | 75–37 | 200 | P2 Report |
| Sep 11 | 16:30 | Cuba | 3–0 | Dominican Republic | 25–18 | 25–17 | 25–19 | | | 75–54 | 310 | P2 Report |
| Sep 12 | 11:00 | Cuba | 3–0 | Guatemala | 25–13 | 25–14 | 25–10 | | | 75–37 | 506 | P2 Report |
| Sep 12 | 16:30 | United States | 3–0 | Dominican Republic | 25–17 | 25–15 | 25–19 | | | 75–51 | 1,500 | P2 Report |
| Sep 13 | 11:00 | Dominican Republic | 3–0 | Guatemala | 25–20 | 25–19 | 25–15 | | | 75–54 | 365 | P2 Report |
| Sep 13 | 16:30 | United States | 3–1 | Cuba | 19–25 | 25–23 | 25–18 | 25–14 | | 94–80 | 1,500 | P2 Report |

== Final round ==
- All times are Atlantic Time (UTC-04:00).

Quarterfinals
14 September
Mexico | 1
Dominican Republic | 3
14 September
Cuba | 3
Puerto Rico | 0

Semifinals
15 September
United States | 3
Dominican Republic | 0
15 September
Canada | 3
Cuba | 0

Final
16 September
United States | 3
Canada | 2
Third place match
16 September
Dominican Republic | 0
Cuba | 3

5th-8th semifinals
15 September
Guatemala | 0
Puerto Rico | 3
15 September
Curaçao | 0
Mexico | 3

Fifth place match
16 September
Puerto Rico | 0
Mexico | 3
Seventh place match
16 September
Guatemala | 3
Curaçao | 0

=== Quarterfinals ===
| Date | Time | | Score | | Set 1 | Set 2 | Set 3 | Set 4 | Set 5 | Total | Attd | Report |
|---|---|---|---|---|---|---|---|---|---|---|---|---|
| Sep 14 | 16:30 | Cuba | 3–0 | Puerto Rico | 25–21 | 25–23 | 25–14 | | | 75–58 | 302 | P2 Report |
| Sep 14 | 19:00 | Mexico | 1–3 | Dominican Republic | 25–16 | 19–25 | 19–25 | 19–25 | | 82–91 | 530 | P2 Report |

=== 5th-8th semifinals ===
| Date | Time | | Score | | Set 1 | Set 2 | Set 3 | Set 4 | Set 5 | Total | Attd | Report |
|---|---|---|---|---|---|---|---|---|---|---|---|---|
| Sep 15 | 11:00 | Guatemala | 0–3 | Puerto Rico | 14–25 | 21–25 | 15–25 | | | 50–75 | 604 | P2 Report |
| Sep 15 | 13:30 | Curaçao | 0–3 | Mexico | 20–25 | 19–25 | 20–25 | | | 59–75 | 400 | P2 Report |

=== Semifinals ===
| Date | Time | | Score | | Set 1 | Set 2 | Set 3 | Set 4 | Set 5 | Total | Attd | Report |
|---|---|---|---|---|---|---|---|---|---|---|---|---|
| Sep 15 | 16:30 | Canada | 3–0 | Cuba | 26–24 | 25–22 | 25–17 | | | 76–63 | 680 | P2 Report |
| Sep 15 | 19:00 | United States | 3–0 | Dominican Republic | 25–20 | 25–15 | 25–19 | | | 75–54 | 1,000 | P2 Report |

=== Seventh place match ===
| Date | Time | | Score | | Set 1 | Set 2 | Set 3 | Set 4 | Set 5 | Total | Attd | Report |
|---|---|---|---|---|---|---|---|---|---|---|---|---|
| Sep 16 | 11:00 | Guatemala | 3–0 | Curaçao | 25–21 | 25–20 | 25–20 | | | 75–61 | 387 | P2 Report |

=== Fifth place match ===
| Date | Time | | Score | | Set 1 | Set 2 | Set 3 | Set 4 | Set 5 | Total | Attd | Report |
|---|---|---|---|---|---|---|---|---|---|---|---|---|
| Sep 16 | 13:00 | Puerto Rico | 0–3 | Mexico | 24–26 | 31–33 | 16–25 | | | 71–84 | 300 | Report |

=== Third place match ===
| Date | Time | | Score | | Set 1 | Set 2 | Set 3 | Set 4 | Set 5 | Total | Attd | Report |
|---|---|---|---|---|---|---|---|---|---|---|---|---|
| Sep 16 | 16:30 | Dominican Republic | 0–3 | Cuba | 22–25 | 19–25 | 24–26 | | | 65–76 | 575 | P2 Report |

=== Final ===
| Date | Time | | Score | | Set 1 | Set 2 | Set 3 | Set 4 | Set 5 | Total | Attd | Report |
|---|---|---|---|---|---|---|---|---|---|---|---|---|
| Sep 16 | 19:00 | United States | 3–2 | Canada | 25–19 | 26–24 | 25–27 | 17–25 | 15–13 | 108–108 | 2,000 | P2 Report |

== Final standings ==
| Pos | Team | Pld | W | L | Pts | SW | SL | SR | SPW | SPL | SPR | Qualification |
|---|---|---|---|---|---|---|---|---|---|---|---|---|
| 1st place, gold medalist(s) | United States | 5 | 5 | 0 | 14 | 15 | 3 | 5.000 | 427 | 330 | 1.294 | Qualified for the 2027 World Cup and the 2028 Summer Olympics as hosts |
| 2nd place, silver medalist(s) | Canada (H) | 5 | 4 | 1 | 13 | 14 | 3 | 4.667 | 409 | 323 | 1.266 | Qualified for the 2027 World Cup and 2028 Summer Olympics qualifier |
| 3rd place, bronze medalist(s) | Cuba | 6 | 4 | 2 | 12 | 13 | 6 | 2.167 | 444 | 384 | 1.156 | Qualified for the 2027 World Cup and 2028 Summer Olympics qualifier |
| 4 | Dominican Republic | 6 | 2 | 4 | 6 | 6 | 13 | 0.462 | 390 | 437 | 0.892 | Qualified for the 2028 Summer Olympics qualifier |
| 5 | Mexico | 6 | 4 | 2 | 12 | 13 | 7 | 1.857 | 459 | 438 | 1.048 | Qualified for the 2028 Summer Olympics qualifier |
| 6 | Puerto Rico | 6 | 2 | 4 | 6 | 7 | 12 | 0.583 | 422 | 437 | 0.966 | |
| 7 | Guatemala | 5 | 1 | 4 | 3 | 3 | 12 | 0.250 | 253 | 361 | 0.701 | |
| 8 | Curaçao | 5 | 0 | 5 | 0 | 0 | 15 | 0.000 | 281 | 375 | 0.749 | |

Source: Summary of Stats
(H) Host

== Awards ==
2026 Men's NORCECA Volleyball champions

United States
11th title

The following awards were given at the conclusion of the tournament:

- Most valuable player
  (United States) Erik Shoji
- Best spikers
  (Canada) Eric Loeppky
  (Cuba) Miguel Ángel López
- Best scorer
  (Mexico) Diego González
- Best blockers
  (Cuba) Alexis Wilson
  (Mexico) Juan García
- Best setter
  (Cuba) Christian Thondike
- Best opposite
  (Mexico) Diego González
- Best libero
  (Dominican Republic) Enger Mieses
- Best digger
  (Dominican Republic) Enger Mieses
- Best receiver
  (Puerto Rico) Arnel Cabrera
- Best server
  (Canada) Lionel McCarthy

=== Statistics ===
==== Top 5 scorers ====
| Rank | Name | Points |
|---|---|---|
| 1 | (Mexico) Diego González | 80 |
| 2 | (Puerto Rico) Pelegrín Vargas | 76 |
| 3 | (Cuba) Alejandro González | 74 |
| 3 | (Mexico) Franky Hernández | 74 |
| 5 | (Dominican Republic) Adrián Figueroa | 73 |

== 2028 Summer Olympics qualifier ==
Unlike other continental championships, whose champions qualify directly for the Olympic Games, the NORCECA utilized a separate qualification process. The top four eligible teams—excluding the United States, which qualified automatically as the host nation—competed in a single-elimination tournament to determine the NORCECA representative for the 2028 Summer Olympics.

Semifinal
September 18
Cuba | 3
Dominican Republic | 0
September 18
Canada | 3
Mexico | 0

Final
September 19
Cuba | 3
Canada | 1
Third place match
September 19
Dominican Republic | 0
Mexico | 3

=== Semifinals ===
| Date | Time | | Score | | Set 1 | Set 2 | Set 3 | Set 4 | Set 5 | Total | Attd | Report |
|---|---|---|---|---|---|---|---|---|---|---|---|---|
| Sep 18 | 16:30 | Canada | 3–0 | Mexico | 25–21 | 25–18 | 25–13 | | | 75–52 | 3,000 | P2 Report |
| Sep 18 | 18:00 | Cuba | 3–0 | Dominican Republic | 32–30 | 25–19 | 25–15 | | | 82–64 | 2,000 | P2 Report |

=== 3rd place match ===
| Date | Time | | Score | | Set 1 | Set 2 | Set 3 | Set 4 | Set 5 | Total | Attd | Report |
|---|---|---|---|---|---|---|---|---|---|---|---|---|
| Sep 19 | 16:30 | Dominican Republic | 0–3 | Mexico | 17–25 | 22–25 | 23–25 | | | 62–75 | 3,500 | P2 Report |

=== Final ===
| Date | Time | | Score | | Set 1 | Set 2 | Set 3 | Set 4 | Set 5 | Total | Attd | Report |
|---|---|---|---|---|---|---|---|---|---|---|---|---|
| Sep 19 | 18:00 | Cuba | 3–1 | Canada | 25–21 | 25–23 | 23–25 | 25–22 | | 98–91 | 4,000 | P2 Report |

== See also ==
- 2026 AVC Men's Volleyball Continental Championship
- 2026 Men's African Nations Volleyball Championship
- 2026 Men's European Volleyball Championship
- 2026 Men's South American Volleyball Championship

Reference
[ Preview]
[ Day 1]
[ Day 2]
[ Day 3]
[ Day 4]
[ Day 5]
[ Day 6]
