= 2026 AVC Men's Volleyball Continental Championship =

買取大吉アジア男子バレーボール選手権大会 福岡2026 (Japanese); Kaitori Daikichi Ajia Danshi Barēbōru Senshuken Taikai Fukuoka 2026

Tournament details
- Host country: Japan
- City: Kitakyushu (Note: For promotional purposes the host of the tournament is designated as Fukuoka.)
- Dates: 4–13 September
- Teams: 12 (from 1 confederation)
- Venue: 1 (in 1 host city)

Final positions
- Champions: Japan (11th title)
- Runners-up: Iran
- Third place: South Korea
- Fourth place: Australia

Tournament awards
- MVP: (Japan) Ran Takahashi
- Best Setter: (Japan) Hideomi Fukatsu
- Best OH: (Iran) Poriya Khanzadeh; (Japan) Ran Takahashi
- Best MB: (Japan) Taishi Onodera; (Iran) Seyed Eisa
- Best OPP: (Iran) Ali Hajipour
- Best Libero: (South Korea) Park Kyeong-min

Tournament statistics
- Matches played: 26
- Attendance: 71,254 (2,741 per match)

The 2026 AVC Men's Volleyball Continental Championship, officially named the Kaitori Daikichi AVC Men's Volleyball Continental Fukuoka 2026 (Japanese: 買取大吉アジア男子バレーボール選手権大会 福岡2026) for sponsorship reasons, was the 23rd staging of the AVC Men's Volleyball Continental Championship, a biennial international volleyball tournament by the Asian Volleyball Confederation (AVC) with Japan Volleyball Association (JVA). It took place at Kitakyushu City General Gymnasium in Kitakyushu, Fukuoka Prefecture, Japan from 4 to 13 September 2026.

Following structural adjustments to the international volleyball calendar by the Fédération Internationale de Volleyball (FIVB), Continental Championships are now permanently staged during even-numbered years to maximize player welfare and clean up qualification pathways. The 2026 edition will serve as a direct qualification pathway for major international tournaments. The winning team will earn a direct quota place for the 2028 Summer Olympics, while the top three finishers will secure qualification spots for the 2027 FIVB Men's Volleyball World Cup.

Host nation Japan defeated Iran 3–0 in the final to retain the continental title. The victory earned Japan direct qualification for the 2028 Summer Olympics. In the third place matxh, South Korea defeated Australia 3–2 to claim the bronze medal. As the top three finishers of the tournament, Japan, Iran, and South Korea qualified for the 2027 FIVB World Cup. Ran Takahashi of Japan was named the MVP of the tournament.

== Year change ==
On 22 June 2023, the Fédération Internationale de Volleyball (FIVB) announced a comprehensive restructuring of the international calendar for the 2025–2028 cycle. As part of this overhaul, continental championships shifted from odd-numbered years to even-numbered years, beginning in 2026. The structural change was implemented to prioritize athlete health and recovery by reducing calendar congestion, as well as to streamline the qualification pathways for major global tournaments such as the FIVB World Cup and the Olympic Games.

== Host selection ==
On 20 December 2025, the Asian Volleyball Confederation officially unveiled its comprehensive calendar for the 2026 international season following joint meetings with the FIVB and Volleyball World in Bangkok, Thailand. During this announcement, Kitakyushu, Japan was confirmed as the host city for the Men's Continental Championship.

On July 3, 2026, the Japan Volleyball Association (JVA) confirmed that Kaitori Daikichi would serve as the tournament's title sponsor.

== Teams ==
=== Qualification ===
The tournament featured a maximum of 12 teams, qualified through the following criteria:

- Host country (1)
- Runners-up (Note: As Japan had qualified as the hosts, its slot was reallocated to Iran who is the runners-up of the previous championship.) of the 2023 edition (1)
- AVC Nations Cup champion (1)
- FIVB World Ranking (4)
- Zonal champions/qualification (5)

The final list of participating teams was officially confirmed by the AVC on 6 February 2026.

Team	Method of qualification	Date of qualification	Appearance(s)				Previous best performance (Note: Bold text indicates they hosted that edition.)
Team	Method of qualification	Date of qualification	Total	First	Last	Streak	Previous best performance
Japan	Hosts	20 December 2025	23rd	1975	2023	23	Champions (10 times) (Note: Japan have won in 1975, 1983, 1987, 1991, 1995, 2005, 2009, 2015, 2017, 2023.)
Iran	2023 Asian Championship runners-up	26 August 2023	22nd	1979	2023	19	Champions (2011, 2013, 2019, 2021)
Bahrain	2025 AVC Nations Cup champions	24 June 2025	12th	1979	2023	3	8th place (1987, 2023)
India (Note: As Iran had already qualified, its slot was reallocated to India.)	2025 CAVA Nations League runners-up	23 July 2025	21st	1979	2023	4	4th place (2005)
Oman (Note: As both Qatar and Bahrain had qualified, its slot was reallocated to Oman.)	2025 West Asian Championship 3rd placers	27 July 2025	4th	2013	2019	1	13th place (2019)
Chinese Taipei (Note: As South Korea had qualified, its slot was reallocated to Chinese Taipei.)	2025 Asian Eastern Zonal Championship runners-up	23 August 2025	21st	1983	2023	21	4th place (1983, 1997, 2021)
Thailand	2025 SEA Games champions	19 December 2025	18th	1987	2023	12	5th place (2005)
New Zealand (Note: As Australia had qualified, its slot was reallocated to New Zealand.)	2025 Oceania Qualifier runners-up	22 December 2025	11th	1975	2005	1	7th place (1975)
Qatar	1st World ranked AVC team	1 January 2026	18th	1989	2023	17	3rd place (2023)
South Korea	2nd World ranked AVC team	1 January 2026	23rd	1975	2023	23	Champions (1989, 1993, 2001, 2003)
China	3rd World ranked AVC team	1 January 2026	23rd	1975	2023	23	Champions (1979, 1997, 1999)
Australia	4th World ranked AVC team	1 January 2026	22nd	1975	2021	1	Champions (2007)

=== Seeding ===
Teams were split into three pools with four teams each. The hosts were automatically placed in the top position of Pool A as the first seed, while the previous runners-up were placed at the top of Pool B as the second seed. The next four teams from the FIVB World Ranking were placed across the first and second lines using the serpentine system. The third and fourth lines consisted of the remaining teams according to the ranking and were drawn in the ceremony.

Seeded teams	Line 3	Line 4
Japan (hosts and defending champions) (7); Iran (16); Qatar (21); South Korea (26); China (28); Australia (33)	Bahrain (40); Chinese Taipei (53); India (58)	Thailand (59); Oman (76); New Zealand (82)

=== Draw results ===
The drawing of lots, which featured former members of the Japan men's national volleyball team Tatsuya Fukuzawa and Kunihiro Shimizu as draw assistants, was held at Fuji TV in Tokyo on 11 August 2026.

External videos
- [LIVE] Drawing of Lots - AVC Men's Volleyball Continental Fukuoka 2026

Pool A
Pos	Team
A1	Japan
A2	Australia
A3	Bahrain
A4	Oman

Pool B
Pos	Team
B1	Iran
B2	China
B3	India
B4	New Zealand

Pool C
Pos	Team
C1	Qatar
C2	South Korea
C3	Chinese Taipei
C4	Thailand

=== Squads ===
Each of the 12 national teams participating in the tournament was required to submit a provisional release list of 25 players by 5 August 2026, before finalizing a tournament squad of 12 to 14 players by 28 August 2026.

== Venue ==
On 3 July 2026, the Japan Volleyball Association (JVA) announced that the tournament would be held in Kitakyushu, Fukuoka Prefecture, Japan. All matches are scheduled to take place at Kitakyushu City General Gymnasium.

Kitakyushu, Fukuoka Prefecture, Japan	Location map of the host venue
Kitakyushu City General Gymnasium	Location map of the host venue
Capacity: 10,000	Location map of the host venue

== Team ranking system ==
=== Pool standing procedure ===
To establish the ranking of teams after the preliminary round, the following criteria were implemented:

1. Total number of victories (matches won, matches lost)
2. In the event of a tie, the following first tiebreaker will apply: The teams will be ranked by the most point gained per match as follows:
  - Match won 3–0 or 3–1: 3 points for the winner, 0 points for the loser
  - Match won 3–2: 2 points for the winner, 1 point for the loser
  - Match forfeited: 3 points for the winner, 0 points (0–25, 0–25, 0–25) for the loser
3. If teams are still tied after examining the number of victories and points gained, then the AVC will examine the results in order to break the tie in the following order:
  - Set quotient: if two or more teams are tied on the number of points gained, they will be ranked by the quotient resulting from the division of the number of all set won by the number of all sets lost.
  - Points quotient: if the tie persists based on the set quotient, the teams will be ranked by the quotient resulting from the division of all points scored by the total of points lost during all sets.
  - If the tie persists based on the point quotient, the tie will be broken based on the team that won the match of the Round Robin Phase between the tied teams. When the tie in point quotient is between three or more teams, these teams ranked taking into consideration only the matches involving the teams in question.

=== Teams combined ranking system ===
To determine the teams playing in the quarterfinals and their match-ups, the following criteria were implemented:

1. Position of the team in the Pool (1st, 2nd, 3rd and 4th)
2. Total number of victories (matches won, matches lost)
3. In the event of a tie, the following first tiebreaker will apply: The teams will be ranked by the most point gained per match as follows:
  - Match won 3–0 or 3–1: 3 points for the winner, 0 points for the loser
  - Match won 3–2: 2 points for the winner, 1 point for the loser
  - Match forfeited: 3 points for the winner, 0 points (0–25, 0–25, 0–25) for the loser
4. If teams are still tied after examining the number of victories and points gained, then the AVC will examine the results in order to break the tie in the following order:
  - Set quotient: if two or more teams are tied on the number of points gained, they will be ranked by the quotient resulting from the division of the number of all set won by the number of all sets lost.
  - Points quotient: if the tie persists based on the set quotient, the teams will be ranked by the quotient resulting from the division of all points scored by the total of points lost during all sets.
  - If the tie persists based on the point quotient, the tie will be broken based on the team that won the match of the Round Robin Phase between the tied teams. When the tie in point quotient is between three or more teams, these teams ranked taking into consideration only the matches involving the teams in question.

=== Final standing procedure ===
To establish the final rankings of teams of the tournament, the following criteria were implemented:

1. After the preliminary round, eliminated teams will be ranked as per the teams combined ranking system from 9th to 12th place.
2. After the quarterfinals, eliminated teams will be ranked as per the teams combined ranking system from 8th to 5th place, including all matches played so far in the preliminary round and the final round.
3. During the final round, the teams that do not win the semi-finals will compete for 4th and 3rd place and the winners of the semi-finals will compete for 2nd and 1st place.

== Preliminary round ==
- All times are Japan Standard Time (UTC+09:00).

=== Pool A ===
Pos	Team	Pld	W	L	Pts	SW	SL	SR	SPW	SPL	SPR	Qualification
1	Japan (H)	3	3	0	9	9	1	9.000	245	172	1.424	Advance to quarter-finals
2	Australia	3	2	1	6	6	3	2.000	204	188	1.085	Advance to quarter-finals
3	Bahrain	3	1	2	3	3	6	0.500	187	208	0.899	
4	Oman	3	0	3	0	1	9	0.111	177	245	0.722	

Source: AVC
Rules for classification: Pool standing procedure
(H) Host

Date	Time		Score		Set 1	Set 2	Set 3	Set 4	Set 5	Total	Attd	Report
4 Sep	19:30	Japan	3–1	Oman	25–18	25–13	20–25	25–9		95–65	6,491	P2 Boxscore
5 Sep	10:00	Australia	3–0	Bahrain	25–20	25–18	25–21			75–59	1,176	P2 Boxscore
6 Sep	19:30	Japan	3–0	Bahrain	25–15	25–15	25–23			75–53	6,639	P2 Boxscore
7 Sep	10:00	Oman	0–3	Australia	18–25	14–25	22–25			54–75	897	P2 Boxscore
8 Sep	19:30	Japan	3–0	Australia	25–20	25–13	25–21			75–54	6,585	P2 Boxscore
9 Sep	10:00	Bahrain	3–0	Oman	25–16	25–19	25–23			75–58	1,032	P2 Boxscore

=== Pool B ===
Pos	Team	Pld	W	L	Pts	SW	SL	SR	SPW	SPL	SPR	Qualification
1	Iran	3	3	0	9	9	1	9.000	251	206	1.218	Advance to quarter-finals
2	China	3	2	1	6	7	3	2.333	248	227	1.093	Advance to quarter-finals
3	India	3	1	2	3	3	6	0.500	211	219	0.963	Advance to quarter-finals
4	New Zealand	3	0	3	0	0	9	0.000	167	225	0.742	

Source: AVC
Rules for classification: Pool standing procedure

Date	Time		Score		Set 1	Set 2	Set 3	Set 4	Set 5	Total	Attd	Report
4 Sep	12:30	Iran	3–0	New Zealand	25–15	25–12	25–22			75–49	914	P2 Boxscore
5 Sep	13:30	China	3–0	India	25–21	28–26	27–25			80–72	1,602	P2 Boxscore
6 Sep	10:00	Iran	3–0	India	25–20	28–26	25–18			78–64	1,359	P2 Boxscore
7 Sep	13:30	New Zealand	0–3	China	17–25	22–25	18–25			57–75	877	P2 Boxscore
8 Sep	10:00	India	3–0	New Zealand	25–22	25–18	25–21			75–61	1,780	P2 Boxscore
9 Sep	17:00	Iran	3–1	China	25–23	23–25	25–22	25–23		98–93	1,538	P2 Boxscore

=== Pool C ===
Pos	Team	Pld	W	L	Pts	SW	SL	SR	SPW	SPL	SPR	Qualification
1	Thailand	3	3	0	7	9	4	2.250	292	256	1.141	Advance to quarter-finals
2	South Korea	3	2	1	7	8	4	2.000	269	243	1.107	Advance to quarter-finals
3	Chinese Taipei	3	1	2	4	6	6	1.000	265	275	0.964	Advance to quarter-finals
4	Qatar	3	0	3	0	0	9	0.000	176	228	0.772	

Source: AVC
Rules for classification: Pool standing procedure

Date	Time		Score		Set 1	Set 2	Set 3	Set 4	Set 5	Total	Attd	Report
4 Sep	16:00	South Korea	3–1	Chinese Taipei	29–27	19–25	25–15	25–15		98–82	1,522	P2 Boxscore
5 Sep	17:00	Qatar	0–3	Thailand	22–25	19–25	14–25			55–75	1,725	P2 Boxscore
6 Sep	13:30	Qatar	0–3	Chinese Taipei	19–25	22–25	26–28			67–78	1,802	P2 Boxscore
7 Sep	17:00	Thailand	3–2	South Korea	25–18	25–16	20–25	22–25	15–12	107–96	1,195	P2 Boxscore
8 Sep	13:30	Qatar	0–3	South Korea	20–25	19–25	15–25			54–75	1,676	P2 Boxscore
9 Sep	13:30	Chinese Taipei	2–3	Thailand	23–25	25–22	25–23	22–25	10–15	105–110	1,175	P2 Boxscore

=== Combined ranking ===
Pos	Pool	Team	Pld	W	L	Pts	SW	SL	SR	SPW	SPL	SPR	Qualification
1	A	Japan (H)	3	3	0	9	9	1	9.000	245	172	1.424	Advance to quarter-finals
2	B	Iran	3	3	0	9	9	1	9.000	251	206	1.218	Advance to quarter-finals
3	C	Thailand	3	3	0	7	9	4	2.250	292	256	1.141	Advance to quarter-finals
4	C	South Korea	3	2	1	7	8	4	2.000	269	243	1.107	Advance to quarter-finals
5	B	China	3	2	1	6	7	3	2.333	248	227	1.093	Advance to quarter-finals
6	A	Australia	3	2	1	6	6	3	2.000	204	188	1.085	Advance to quarter-finals
7	C	Chinese Taipei	3	1	2	4	6	6	1.000	265	275	0.964	Advance to quarter-finals
8	B	India	3	1	2	3	3	6	0.500	211	219	0.963	Advance to quarter-finals
9	A	Bahrain	3	1	2	3	3	6	0.500	187	208	0.899	
10	A	Oman	3	0	3	0	1	9	0.111	177	245	0.722	
11	C	Qatar	3	0	3	0	0	9	0.000	176	228	0.772	
12	B	New Zealand	3	0	3	0	0	9	0.000	167	225	0.742	

Source: AVC
Rules for classification: Teams combined ranking system
(H) Host

== Final round ==
- All times are Japan Standard Time (UTC+09:00).

Quarter-finals
11 Sep
Japan	3
India	0
10 Sep
South Korea	3
China	1
11 Sep
Iran	3
Chinese Taipei	1
10 Sep
Thailand	0
Australia	3

Semi-finals
12 Sep
Japan	3
South Korea	0
12 Sep
Iran	3
Australia	1

Final
13 Sep
Japan	3
Iran	0
Third place match
13 Sep
South Korea	3
Australia	2

=== Quarter-finals ===
Date	Time		Score		Set 1	Set 2	Set 3	Set 4	Set 5	Total	Attd	Report
10 Sep	15:30	Thailand	0–3	Australia	22–25	24–26	19–25			65–76	1,302	P2 Boxscore
10 Sep	19:30	South Korea	3–1	China	17–25	25–21	25–22	29–27		96–95	1,650	P2 Boxscore
11 Sep	15:30	Iran	3–1	Chinese Taipei	25–19	25–19	21–25	25–18		96–81	1,701	P2 Boxscore
11 Sep	19:30	Japan	3–0	India	25–17	25–15	25–19			75–51	6,445	P2 Boxscore

=== Semi-finals ===
Date	Time		Score		Set 1	Set 2	Set 3	Set 4	Set 5	Total	Attd	Report
12 Sep	15:30	Iran	3–1	Australia	25–21	17–25	25–17	25–22		92–85	3,271	P2 Boxscore
12 Sep	19:30	Japan	3–0	South Korea	25–13	25–11	25–14			75–38	6,519	P2 Boxscore

=== Third place match ===
Date	Time		Score		Set 1	Set 2	Set 3	Set 4	Set 5	Total	Attd	Report
13 Sep	15:30	South Korea	3–2	Australia	16–25	25–18	22–25	25–18	15–9	103–95	3,848	P2 Boxscore

=== Final ===
Date	Time		Score		Set 1	Set 2	Set 3	Set 4	Set 5	Total	Attd	Report
13 Sep	19:30	Japan	3–0	Iran	25–21	26–24	25–23			76–68	6,533	P2Boxscore

== Final standing ==
Pos	Team	Pld	W	L	Pts	SW	SL	SR	SPW	SPL	SPR	Qualification
1st place, gold medalist(s)	Japan (H)	6	6	0	18	18	1	18.000	471	329	1.432	Qualified for the 2027 World Cup, 2028 Summer Olympics, and 2028 Continental Championship
2nd place, silver medalist(s)	Iran	6	5	1	15	15	6	2.500	507	448	1.132	Qualified for the 2027 World Cup
3rd place, bronze medalist(s)	South Korea	6	4	2	12	14	10	1.400	506	508	0.996	Qualified for the 2027 World Cup
4	Australia	6	3	3	10	12	9	1.333	460	448	1.027	
5	Thailand	4	3	1	7	9	7	1.286	357	331	1.079	
6	China	4	2	2	6	8	6	1.333	343	323	1.062	
7	Chinese Taipei	4	1	3	4	7	9	0.778	346	371	0.933	
8	India	4	1	3	3	3	9	0.333	261	294	0.888	
9	Bahrain	3	1	2	3	3	6	0.500	187	208	0.899	
10	Oman	3	0	3	0	1	9	0.111	177	245	0.722	
11	Qatar	3	0	3	0	0	9	0.000	176	228	0.772	
12	New Zealand	3	0	3	0	0	9	0.000	167	225	0.742	

Source: Volleyball World
(H) Host

== Awards ==
2026 AVC Men's Volleyball Continental champions

Japan
Eleventh title

The following awards were given at the conclusion of the tournament:

- Most valuable player
  (Japan) Ran Takahashi
- Best setter
  (Japan) Hideomi Fukatsu
- Best outside spikers
  (Iran) Poriya Khanzadeh
  (Japan) Ran Takahashi
- Best middle blockers
  (Japan) Taishi Onodera
  (Iran) Seyed Eisa
- Best opposite spiker
  (Iran) Ali Hajipour
- Best libero
  (South Korea) Park Kyeong-min

== See also ==
- 2026 Men's African Nations Volleyball Championship
- 2026 Men's European Volleyball Championship
- 2026 Men's NORCECA Volleyball Championship
- 2026 Men's South American Volleyball Championship
- 2026 AVC Men's Volleyball Cup
- 2026 AVC Boys' U18 Volleyball Championship
