= 2026 Men's South American Volleyball Championship =

Tournament details
- Host country: Brazil
- City: Rio de Janeiro
- Dates: 15–20 September
- Teams: 6
- Venue: 1 (in 1 host city)

Final positions
- Champions: Brazil (34th title)
- Runners-up: Argentina
- Third place: Chile
- Fourth place: Colombia

Tournament awards
- MVP: (Brazil) Ricardo Lucarelli
- Best Setter: (Brazil) Fernando Kreling
- Best OH: (Brazil) Adriano Xavier; (Chile) Noé Aravena
- Best MB: (Brazil) Flávio Gualberto; (Argentina) Agustín Loser
- Best OPP: (Brazil) Darlan Souza
- Best Libero: (Argentina) Franco Massimino

Tournament statistics
- Matches played: 15
- Attendance: 38,360 (2,557 per match)

The 2026 Men's South American Volleyball Championship was the 36th edition of the Men's South American Volleyball Championship, held in Rio de Janeiro, Brazil, and organized by the South American volleyball governing body, the Confederación Sudamericana de Voleibol (CSV). For the first time, the tournament winner directly qualified for the 2028 Summer Olympics, while the top three teams secured qualification for the 2027 FIVB World Cup.

Hosts Brazil captured their 34th title and secured a spot for the 2028 Olympic Games after an undefeated run capped by a 3–0 victory over Argentina in the final match day. Alongside champions Brazil, runners-up Argentina qualified for the 2027 FIVB World Cup, while Chile secured the bronze medal and final World Cup berth by defeating Bolivia 3–0.

== Year change ==
On 22 June 2023, the Fédération Internationale de Volleyball (FIVB) announced a comprehensive restructuring of the international calendar for the 2025–2028 cycle. As part of this overhaul, continental championships shifted from odd-numbered years to even-numbered years, beginning in 2026. The structural change was implemented to prioritize athlete health and recovery by reducing calendar congestion, as well as to streamline the qualification pathways for major global tournaments such as the FIVB World Cup and the Olympic Games.

== Competing nations ==
The following national teams will participate:

- Argentina
- Bolivia
- Brazil (Hosts)
- Chile
- Colombia
- Venezuela

== Venues ==
All Matches
Rio de Janeiro, Brazil
Ginásio do Maracanãzinho
Capacity: 11,800

== Pool standing procedure ==
1. Number of matches won
2. Match points
3. Sets ratio
4. Points ratio
5. If the tie continues as per the point ratio between two teams, the priority will be given to the team which won the last match between them. When the tie in points ratio is between three or more teams, a new classification of these teams in the terms of points 1, 2 and 3 will be made taking into consideration only the matches in which they were opposed to each other.

Match won 3–0 or 3–1: 3 match points for the winner, 0 match points for the loser
Match won 3–2: 2 match points for the winner, 1 match point for the loser

== Standing and results ==
- All times are Brasília Time (UTC−03:00).

Pos	Team	Pld	W	L	Pts	SW	SL	SR	SPW	SPL	SPR	Qualification
1st place, gold medalist(s)	Brazil (H)	5	5	0	15	15	0	MAX	375	275	1.364	Qualified for the 2027 World Cup, 2028 Summer Olympics, and 2028 South American Championship
2nd place, silver medalist(s)	Argentina	5	4	1	12	12	5	2.400	411	342	1.202	Qualified for the 2027 World Cup
3rd place, bronze medalist(s)	Chile	5	3	2	9	9	6	1.500	347	300	1.157	Qualified for the 2027 World Cup
4	Colombia	5	2	3	6	7	10	0.700	368	395	0.932	
5	Venezuela	5	1	4	3	5	13	0.385	353	428	0.825	
6	Bolivia	5	0	5	0	1	15	0.067	286	400	0.715	

Source: FIVB Live Center
(H) Host

Date	Time		Score		Set 1	Set 2	Set 3	Set 4	Set 5	Total	Attd	Report
15 Sep	14:00	Argentina	3–1	Venezuela	25–16	25–11	23–25	25–13		98–65	375	P2 Report
15 Sep	17:00	Colombia	3–0	Bolivia	25–23	25–20	25–17			75–60	820	P2 Report
15 Sep	20:00	Brazil	3–0	Chile	25–23	25–16	25–21			75–60	2,603	P2 Report
16 Sep	14:00	Argentina	3–1	Colombia	25–21	25–18	22–25	25–23		97–87	570	P2 Report
16 Sep	17:00	Venezuela	0–3	Chile	13–25	14–25	21–25			48–75	690	P2 Report
16 Sep	20:00	Brazil	3–0	Bolivia	25–18	25–13	25–16			75–47	3,244	P2 Report
17 Sep	14:00	Argentina	3–0	Chile	28–26	25–19	25–17			78–62	470	P2 Report
17 Sep	17:00	Bolivia	1–3	Venezuela	12–25	25–23	21–25	25–27		83–100	774	P2 Report
17 Sep	20:00	Brazil	3–0	Colombia	25–23	25–14	25–16			75–53	2,980	P2 Report
19 Sep	11:00	Brazil	3–0	Venezuela	25–19	25–14	25–19			75–52	10,387	P2 Report
19 Sep	14:00	Argentina	3–0	Bolivia	25–17	25–15	25–21			75–53	1,750	P2 Report
19 Sep	17:00	Chile	3–0	Colombia	25–16	25–22	25–18			75–56	866	P2 Report
20 Sep	10:00	Brazil	3–0	Argentina	25–20	25–23	25–20			75–63	11,968	P2 Report
20 Sep	13:00	Chile	3–0	Bolivia	25–11	25–15	25–17			75–43	633	P2 Report
20 Sep	16:00	Venezuela	1–3	Colombia	25–22	21–25	23–25	19–25		88–97	230	P2 Report

== Awards ==
2026 Men's South American Volleyball champions

Brazil
34th title

The following awards were given at the conclusion of the tournament:

- Most valuable player
  (Brazil) Ricardo Lucarelli
- Best setter
  (Brazil) Fernando Kreling
- Best outside spikers
  (Brazil) Adriano Xavier
  (Chile) Noé Aravena
- Best middle blockers
  (Brazil) Flávio Gualberto
  (Argentina) Agustín Loser
- Best opposite spiker
  (Brazil) Darlan Souza
- Best libero
  (Argentina) Franco Massimino

== See also ==
- 2026 AVC Men's Volleyball Continental Championship
- 2026 Men's European Volleyball Championship
- 2026 Men's NORCECA Volleyball Championship
- 2026 Men's African Nations Volleyball Championship
- 2026 Copa Sudamericana (men's volleyball)
