= Théo Faure =

French volleyball player (born 1999)

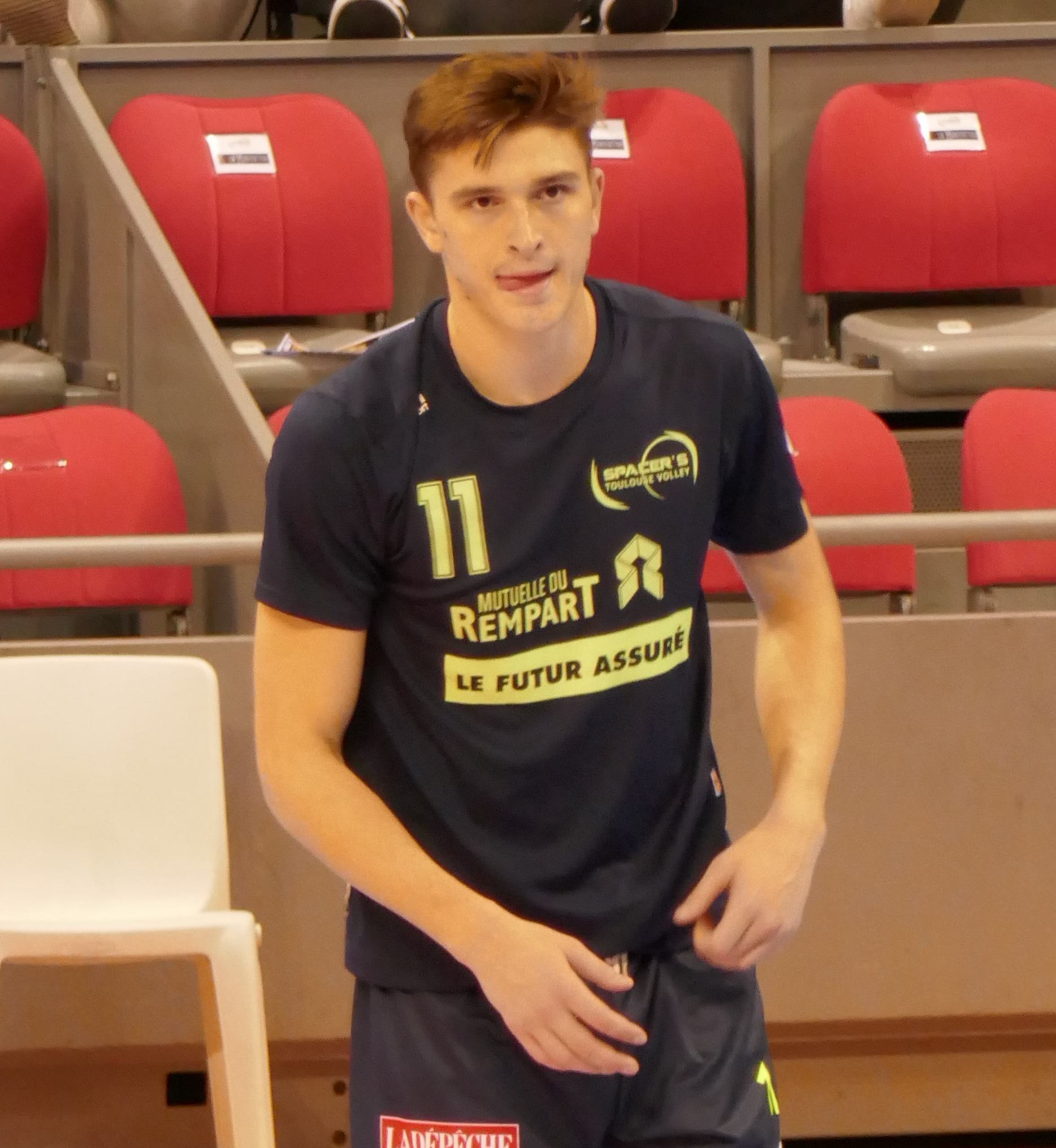
- Faure in 2019

Personal information
- Born: 12 October 1999 (age 27) Pessac, France
- Height: 2.02 m (6 ft 8 in)
- Weight: 93 kg (205 lb)

Volleyball information
- Position: Opposite
- Current club: Trentino Volley

Career
- Years: Team
- 2017–2021 2021–2023 2023–2025 2025–: Spacer's de Toulouse; Montpellier Volley; Cisterna Volley; Trentino Volley

National team
- Years: Team
- 2021–: France
Honours
Men's volleyball
Representing France
Olympic Games
| Gold medal – first place | 2024 Paris | Team |
FIVB Nations League
| Gold medal – first place | 2024 Łódź |
CEV European Championship
| Silver medal – second place | 2026 Bulgaria/Finland/Italy/Romania |

Théo Faure (French pronunciation: [teo fɔʁ]; born 12 October 1999) is a French professional volleyball player who plays as an opposite spiker for Trentino Volley and the France national team.

== Personal life ==
Both his parents played volleyball professionally. His father, Stéphane was a captain of the France national team, and his mother is a German Olympian, Beate Bühler.

== Honours ==
=== Club ===
- Domestic
  - 2021–22 French Championship, with Montpellier Volley
  - 2022–23 French SuperCup, with Montpellier Volley
