= 2026 Men's European Volleyball Championship =

2026 Европейско първенство по волейбол (Bulgarian); 2026 Euroopan lentopallon mestaruuskilpailut (Finnish); Europamästerskapet i volleyboll för herrar 2026 (Swedish); 2026 Campionato Europeo di Pallavolo (Italian); 2026 Campionatul European de Volei (Romanian)
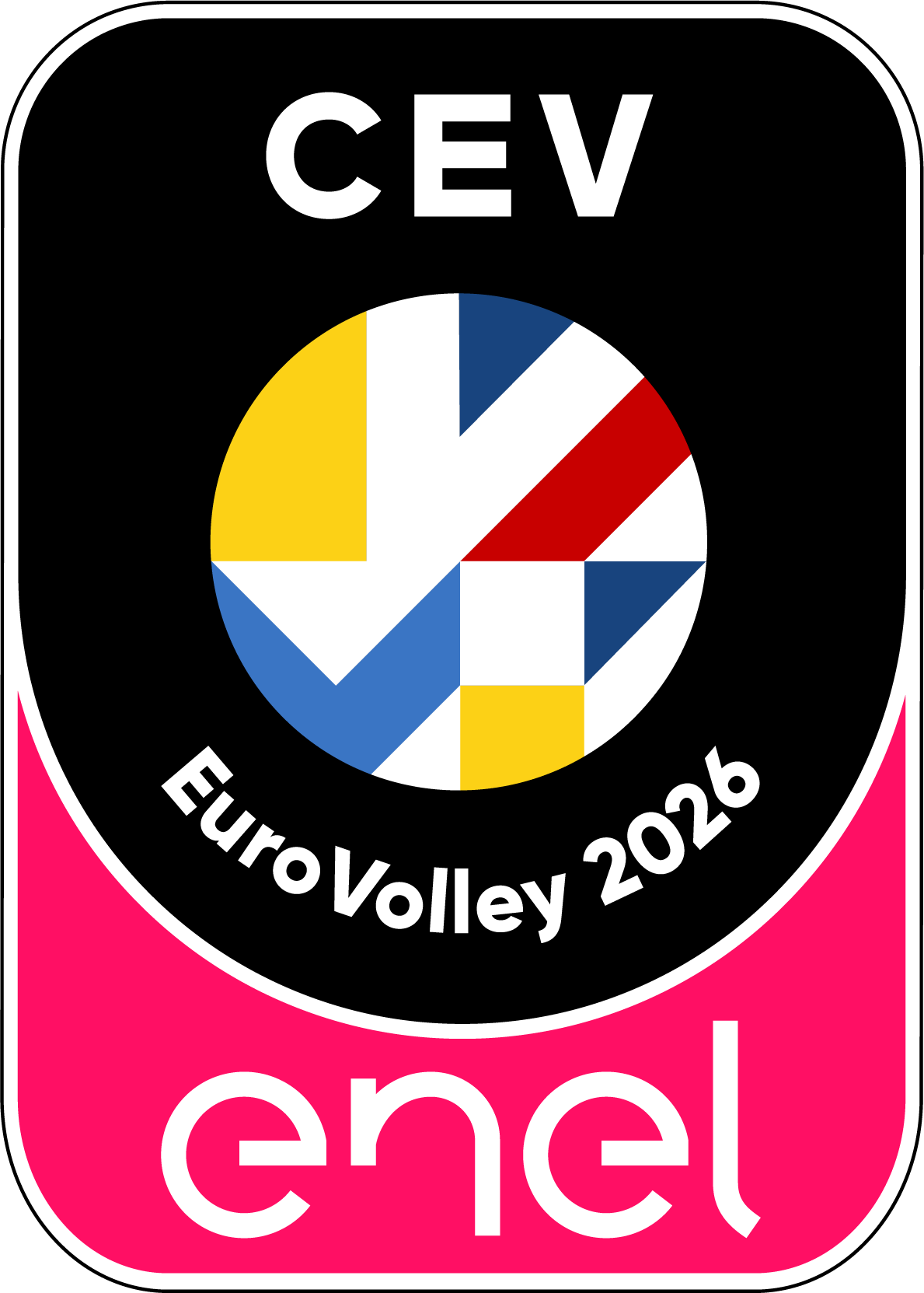

Tournament details
- Host countries: Italy; Bulgaria; Finland; Romania
- Cities: Naples; Modena; Turin; Milan; Sofia; Tampere; Cluj-Napoca
- Dates: 9–26 September
- Teams: 24 (from 1 confederation)
- Venue: 7 (in 7 host cities)

Final positions
- Champions: Poland (3rd title)
- Runners-up: France
- Third place: Finland
- Fourth place: Slovenia

Tournament awards
- MVP: (Poland) Wilfredo León
- Best Setter: (France) Antoine Brizard
- Best OH: (Poland) Wilfredo León; (Finland) Nooa Marttila
- Best MB: (Poland) Bartłomiej Lemański; (Poland) Szymon Jakubiszak
- Best OPP: (France) Théo Faure
- Best Libero: (Poland) Jakub Popiwczak

Tournament statistics
- Matches played: 76
- Attendance: 265,796 (3,497 per match)

The 2026 Men's European Volleyball Championship, commonly referred to as EuroVolley Men 2026 (and the CEV Enel EuroVolley 2026 for sponsorship reasons), was the 34th edition of the Men's European Volleyball Championship, a biennial international volleyball tournament organised by European Volleyball Confederation (CEV). The tournament took place from 9 to 26 September 2026 across Bulgaria, Finland, Italy, and Romania, marking the fourth consecutive time EuroVolley has been hosted by four nations since the multi-country hosting system was first used in 2019. Italy hosted the final in Milan.

24 teams participated for the fourth time. Qualification took place in August 2024 and 2025 to decide the final 12 spots. The four co-hosts qualified automatically.

After FIVB's calendar changes starting 2025, this would be the first European Championship since 1958 to be held in an even-numbered year.

The winner qualified for the 2028 Summer Olympics while the top three finishers qualified for the 2027 FIVB World Cup.

Poland were the defending champions, having beaten Italy 3–0 in the final of the 2023 tournament in Rome. They retained the title after defeating France 3–1 in the final.

Finland claimed their first-ever medal at the European Volleyball Championship by defeating Slovenia 3–0 in the bronze medal match.

== Year change ==
On 22 June 2023, the Fédération Internationale de Volleyball (FIVB) announced a comprehensive restructuring of the international calendar for the 2025–2028 cycle. As part of this overhaul, continental championships shifted from odd-numbered years to even-numbered years, beginning in 2026. The structural change was implemented to prioritize athlete health and recovery by reducing calendar congestion, as well as to streamline the qualification pathways for major global tournaments such as the FIVB World Cup and the Olympic Games.

== Host selection ==
- Romania – On 5 December 2022, Romania was announced as the first host. This is Romania's first time hosting since 1963 and third in total after 1955 and 1963.
- Bulgaria – Bulgaria was confirmed as the second host on 26 February 2024, becoming the first ever country to host back to back European Championships. This is Bulgaria's fifth organisation of EuroVolley, after 1950, 1981, 2015 and 2023.
- Finland – Finnish city, Tampere, was given the hosting rights on 14 March 2024 and will host a group. This is the Finns fourth time holding the event, with Finland previously hosting in 1977, 1993 and 2021.
- Italy – On 25 March 2024 Italy was announced as the fourth and final host. Alongside Bulgaria, Italy becomes the second country to host consecutive championships. The tournament has previously taken place in Italy in 1948, 1971, 2005, 2015 and 2023.

=== Rejected countries ===
The following countries had expressed interest but didn't make the cut:

- Germany – Germany had stated their interest in November 2022 and by May 2023, Germany's interest was approved by CEV with the SAP Garden in Munich being proposed as a possible venue. However, in February 2024, Germany said to CEV that they were not ready to host the event and they would focus on the 2028 edition. The Germans were in line to become the main hosts before their withdrawal. The Italians then took their hosting place as they wrote to CEV saying they wanted to host, which would later be approved.
- Serbia – Serbia was briefly mentioned as a possible host in February 2023, but this never materialised.

== Preparations ==
- On 11 December 2024, the four organisers of EuroVolley 2026 Men held a meeting.

=== Tickets ===
Tickets were released on 7 November 2025.

==== Official ticket websites ====
- Official tickets in Bulgaria
- Official tickets in Finland
- Official tickets in Italy
- Official tickets in Romania

== Qualification ==
Map of qualifiers for the 2026 Men's European Volleyball Championship: Team qualified for 2026 Men's European Volleyball Championship Team failed to qualify Team banned from competition Did not enter

24 teams qualify for the championship. The four co-hosts and the eight best teams from the 2023 edition automatically progress (in the event that one of the best eight teams is also a co-host, the next best team will inherit their place).

21 teams took part in qualification, with 12 spots on the line. The 21 teams were divided into seven groups of three, with the seven group winners plus the five best second place teams qualifying. The games were played in August 2024 and 2025. The groups were divided by the Serpentine system based on each teams' ranking.

Of the 24 teams who qualified, 21 of them were present at the previous tournament. After not even entering qualification for the 2023 edition, Sweden qualified for the first time since 1993. Latvia and Slovakia returned after a one edition absence.

Israel qualified on merit for the first time. Israel and Switzerland qualified for a second consecutive edition for the very first time. North Macedonia and Portugal continued their record appearance streaks with four.

Of the non-qualifiers, Spain failed to qualify after qualifying for the previous four championships. Montenegro failed to advance after qualifying every time since their debut in 2019. Despite narrowly missing out on qualifying automatically, Croatia was winless in qualification and didn't manage to successfully qualify.

Means of qualification	Qualifier	Means of qualification		Qualifier
Host Countries	Bulgaria	Qualification	Pool A	Denmark
Host Countries	Finland	Qualification	Pool B	Belgium
Host Countries	Italy	Qualification	Pool C	Czechia
Host Countries	Romania	Qualification	Pool D	Estonia
2023 European Championship	Poland	Qualification	Pool E	Switzerland
2023 European Championship	Slovenia	Qualification	Pool F	Greece
2023 European Championship	France	Qualification	Pool G	Slovakia
2023 European Championship	Netherlands	Qualification	Best runners-up	Latvia
2023 European Championship	Serbia	Qualification	Best runners-up	Turkey
2023 European Championship	Ukraine	Qualification	Best runners-up	Israel
2023 European Championship	Germany	Qualification	Best runners-up	Sweden
2023 European Championship	Portugal	Qualification	Best runners-up	North Macedonia
Total 24

=== Summary of qualified teams ===
Team	Qualification method	Date of qualification	Appearance(s)				Previous best performance (Note: Bold text indicates they hosted that edition.)	WR (Note: World ranking at start of tournament.)
Team	Qualification method	Date of qualification	Total	First	Last	Streak	Previous best performance	WR
Romania	Host nation	5 December 2022	19th	1950	2023	2	Champions (1963)	35
France	Top eight in 2023	8 September 2023	32nd	1948	2023	15	Champions (2015)	8
Slovenia	Top eight in 2023	9 September 2023	11th	2001	2023	10	Runners-up (2015, 2019, 2021)	4
Italy (Note: Italy also belatedly qualified as a 2026 host nation.)	Top eight in 2023	9 September 2023	33rd	1948	2023	32	Champions (7 times) (Note: Italy have won in 1989, 1993, 1995, 1999, 2003, 2005 and 2021.)	2
Ukraine	Top eight in 2023	9 September 2023	9th	1993	2023	4	6th place (1993)	11
Netherlands	Top eight in 2023	9 September 2023	29th	1948	2023	7	Champions (1997)	21
Serbia (Note: Competed as SFR Yugoslavia from 1956 to 1991, and as FR Yugoslavia/Serbia and Montenegro from 1998 to 2006.)	Top eight in 2023	10 September 2023	30th	2007	2023	15	Champions (2001, 2011, 2019)	13
Poland	Top eight in 2023	10 September 2023	29th	1950	2023	13	Champions (2009, 2023)	1
Bulgaria	Host nation	26 February 2024	32nd	1950	2023	10	Runners-up (1951)	9
Germany	Ninth in 2023	26 February 2024	16th	1991	2023	25	Runners-up (2017)	12
Finland	Host nation	14 March 2024	21st	1955	2023	10	4th place (2007)	16
Portugal	Tenth in 2023	24 March 2024	8th	1948	2023	4	4th place (1948)	26
Czechia (Note: Competed as Czechoslovakia from 1949 to 1990.)	Pool C winner	9 August 2025	15th	1995	2023	9	Champions (1948, 1955, 1958)	20
Belgium	Pool B winner	9 August 2025	19th	1948	2023	4	4th place (2017)	18
Türkiye	Five best runner-ups	13 August 2025	13th	1958	2023	5	10th place (2021)	10
Estonia	Pool D winner	13 August 2025	8th	2009	2023	6	11th place (2015)	30
Greece	Pool F winner	13 August 2025	18th	1967	2023	4	3rd place (1987)	23
Slovakia	Pool G winner	13 August 2025	12th	1997	2021	1	5th place (2011)	44
Switzerland	Pool E winner	13 August 2025	3rd	1971	2023	2	19th place (1971)	28
Denmark	Pool A winner	13 August 2025	6th	1958	2023	2	12th place (2013)	31
Sweden	Five best runner-ups	13 August 2025	7th	1971	1993	1	Runners-up (1989)	33
Latvia	Five best runner-ups	16 August 2025	3rd	1995	2021	1	11th place (1995)	51
Israel	Five best runner-ups	16 August 2025	4th	1951	2023	2	10th place (1951)	29
North Macedonia	Five best runner-ups	17 August 2025	4th	2019	2023	4	16th place (2023)	54

== Venues ==
Seven venues in seven cities, will host the tournament. After meetings in March 2025, the same city and venue as in 2023, the Palace of Culture and Sports in Varna, was chosen as Bulgaria's venue. In the same month, the BTarena in Cluj-Napoca was announced as the venue for the group in Romania. On 6 June 2025, the Nokia Arena was announced as Finland's venue. On 19 August 2025, Naples, Modena, Turin and Milan were announced as Italy's venues. On 14 October it was announced that Bulgaria's capital, Sofia, would replace Varna as the country's host city with Arena 8888 as the selected venue. This is due to the country's increased interest in volleyball after their second place finish at the 2025 FIVB Men's Volleyball World Championship. Sofia is allocating 500,000 Bulgarian lev for the tournament. Prior to the venue change, Varna MPs Desislav Taskov and Kristian Ganchev sent a letter asking for reassurance that Varna would keep the hosting rights after reports of Varna being replaced by Sofia came out. The director of Sports in Varna, Kristian Dimitrov, was reportedly angry with the venue swap. Varna had previous allocated 420,000 Bulgarian lev for the tournament before the change of venue.

=== Overview of venues ===
==== Italy ====
- Four Italian venues will be used during the tournament. The Piazza del Plebiscito in Naples will host the opening match at the temporary venue at the square. The rest of the group phase will take place in Modena at the PalaPanini, the home for numerous Modena-based clubs.
- Italy's round of 16 and quarterfinal matches will be held at Turin's Palavela. The venue was built in 1961 but renovated in 2004 for the 2006 Winter Olympics, where it held figure skating and short track speed skating events. It has since organised championships in both aforementioned sports, plus Gymnastics and the 2015 Men's European Volleyball Championship.
- The semifinals and final will take place at the Unipol Forum in Milan.

==== Bulgaria ====
- In Bulgaria, the nation's biggest indoor facility, Arena Sofia, would be chosen, replacing the originally chosen Palace of Culture and Sports in Varna. The established venue has hosted various competitions, with this being their third major volleyball tournament after the 2015 Men's European Volleyball Championship and 2018 FIVB Men's Volleyball World Championship. The venue has also hosted Junior Eurovision Song Contest 2015.

==== Finland ====
- In Finland, the Nokia Arena would host games. Constructed in time for the 2022 IIHF World Championship, it has since hosted the 2023 IIHF World Championship and EuroBasket 2025, plus numerous high-profile concerts.

==== Romania ====
- In Romania, the BTarena will organise matches. The venue was built in 2014 but expanded in preparation for EuroBasket 2017. Romania's largest arena would later host the 2021 Women's European Volleyball Championship. Basketball team, U-BT Cluj-Napoca, plays their home games here.

Distribution of tournament
Milan will host the semifinals and final.
Sofia and Turin will host the knockout stage up to the quarterfinals.
Cluj-Napoca, Modena, Sofia and Tampere will host preliminary round games.
Naples hosted the opening match.

(Italy) Milan	(Italy) Turin	(Italy) Naples	(Italy) Modena
Unipol Forum	Palavela	Piazza del Plebiscito	PalaPanini
Capacity: 16,000	Capacity: 9,200	Capacity: 6,500	Capacity: 4,968
2026 Men's European Volleyball Championship is located in Europe
(Bulgaria) Sofia		(Finland) Tampere	(Romania) Cluj-Napoca
Arena 8888		Nokia Arena	BTarena
Capacity: 15,373		Capacity: 13,455	Capacity: 10,000

Tournament venues information
Venue	Rounds	Games
(Italy) Unipol Forum	Semifinals and Final	4
(Italy) Palavela	Round of 16 and Quarterfinals	6
(Bulgaria) Arena 8888	Pool B, Round of 16 and Quarterfinals	21
(Italy) Piazza del Plebiscito	Opening game	1
(Italy) PalaPanini	Pool A	14
(Finland) Nokia Arena	Pool C	15
(Romania) BTarena	Pool D	15

=== Group allocation of hosts ===
- As the main organisers, Italy were seeded into Pool A,
- As the secondary venue, the Bulgaria were positioned in Pool B
- As the two countries hosting a single group, Finland and Romania are placed into Pool C and D respectively.

== Final draw ==
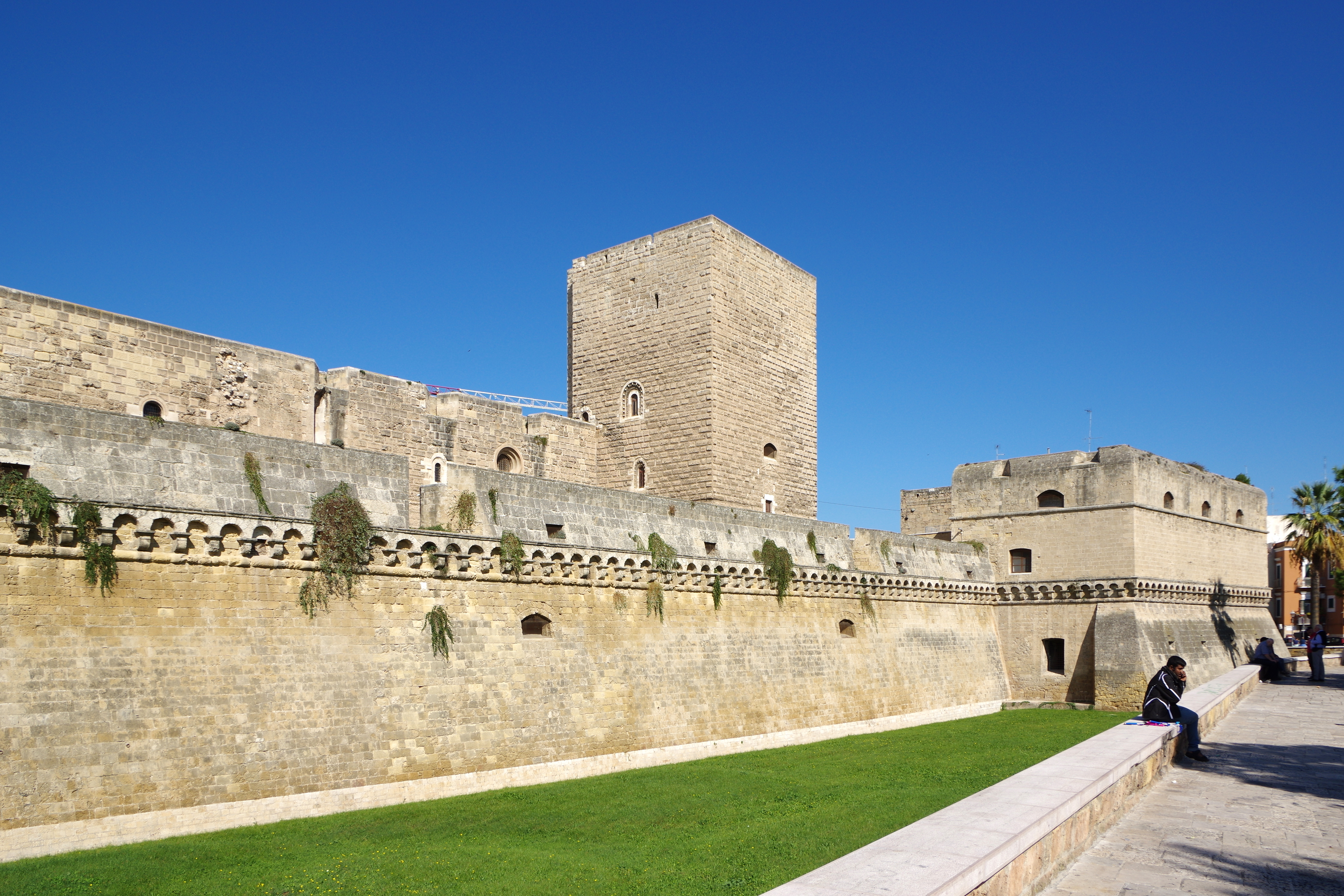
The Castello Normanno-Svevo in Bari hosted the draw.

The final draw took place at 20:45 CET in Bari, Italy on 4 October 2025 at the Castello Normanno-Svevo. Italian journalist, Simona Rolandi and CEV press officer, Federico Ferraro, were the hosts of the final draw. Bulgarian libero Damyan Kolev, Finnish outside hitter Luka Marttila, Italian setter Fabio Vullo and Romanian middle blocker Bela Bartha were the guests for the final draw. The final draw started with the co-hosts and chosen teams being placed into their respective groups and continued with, in order, pots 1, 2, 3 and 4 being drawn, with each team selected then allocated into the first available group alphabetically.

=== Chosen teams ===
The organizers could select one team to join their pools.

Host team	Chosen team
Bulgaria	North Macedonia
Finland	Estonia
Italy	Sweden
Romania	Latvia

=== Seeding ===
The teams are seeded according to the CEV National Team rankings before the draw.

The only restriction is that the two finalists from the previous edition, Italy and Poland, were drawn in different preliminary pools so that can only play each other in the final if they win their groups respectively.

Pot 1	Pot 2	Pot 3	Pot 4
Poland; France; Slovenia; Serbia	Germany; Belgium; Ukraine; Czech Republic	Netherlands; Turkey; Portugal; Greece	Israel; Switzerland; Slovakia; Denmark

=== Draw results ===
- CEV EuroVolley 2026 – Drawing of Lots
- Drawing of Lots Live Streaming

Pool A in Modena (Note: The opening match will be in Naples.)	Pool B in Sofia	Pool C in Tampere	Pool D in Cluj-Napoca
Italy (H)	Bulgaria (H)	Finland (H)	Romania (H)
Sweden	North Macedonia	Estonia	Latvia
Slovenia	Poland	Serbia	France
Czech Republic	Ukraine	Belgium	Germany
Greece	Portugal	Netherlands	Turkey
Slovakia	Israel	Denmark	Switzerland

=== Schedule ===
Official mascot

The schedule was announced on 5 November 2025.

Schedule
Round	Matchday	Date
Preliminary round	All matches	9–17 September 2026
Knockout stage	Round of 16	19–21 September 2026
Knockout stage	Quarterfinals	22–23 September 2026
Knockout stage	Semifinals	25 September 2026
Knockout stage	3rd place & Final	26 September 2026

== Referees ==
The following referees were selected for the tournament.

Refereeing teams
Referee	Country	Pool phase	Round of 16	Quarter-finals	Semi-finals	Final
Jurkovic Ksenija	Croatia	Pool A	✓	✓		✓
Kellenberger Jorg	Germany	Pool A				
Luts Koen	Belgium	Pool A	✓	✓		
Varbanov Atanas	Bulgaria	Pool A	✓	✓		
Yener Seckin	Turkey	Pool A	✓	✓		
Cildir Caner	Turkey	Pool B				
Kalin Yves	Switzerland	Pool B				
Lot Dominga	Italy	Pool B	✓		✓	✓
Mokry Juraj	Slovakia	Pool B	✓	✓	✓	✓
Rogic Dejan	Serbia	Pool B	✓	✓		
Jacob Sebastien	France	Pool C				
Minins Ilja	Latvia	Pool C				
Porvaznik Igor	Slovakia	Pool C				
Rodin Sergej	Lithuania	Pool C				
Szabo-Alexi Paul Catalin	Romania	Pool C	✓		✓	✓
Goncalves Vitor	Portugal	Pool D				
Kovar Vlastimil	Czechia	Pool D	✓	✓		
Alexandros Mylonakis	Greece	Pool D	✓	✓	✓	
Rodriguez Machin	Spain	Pool D				
Yalcin Suleyman	Netherlands	Pool D				

== Preliminary round ==
- All times are local.
- The top four teams in each pool qualify for the final round.
- Match won 3–0 or 3–1: 3 match points for the winner, 0 match points for the loser
- Match won 3–2: 2 match points for the winner, 1 match point for the loser

=== Tiebreakers ===
1. Number of matches won
2. Match points
3. Sets ratio
4. Points ratio
5. If the tie continues as per the point ratio between two teams, the priority is given to the team which won the match between them. When the tie in points ratio is between three or more teams, a new classification of these teams in the terms of points 1, 2, 3 and 4 is made taking into consideration only the matches in which they were opposed to each other.

=== Pool A ===
Pos	Team	Pld	W	L	Pts	SW	SL	SR	SPW	SPL	SPR	Qualification
1	Italy (H)	5	5	0	14	15	4	3.750	459	380	1.208	Round of 16
2	Slovenia	5	3	2	10	12	7	1.714	447	403	1.109	Round of 16
3	Greece	5	3	2	9	10	9	1.111	430	429	1.002	Round of 16
4	Czechia	5	3	2	8	11	9	1.222	446	448	0.996	Round of 16
5	Sweden	5	1	4	4	6	13	0.462	400	435	0.920	
6	Slovakia	5	0	5	0	3	15	0.200	359	446	0.805	

Source: CEV
(H) Host

Date	Time		Score		Set 1	Set 2	Set 3	Set 4	Set 5	Total	Attd	Report
10 Sep	21:05	Italy	3–0	Sweden	25–22	25–21	25–17			75–60	5,914	Report
11 Sep	16:00	Czech Republic	3–1	Greece	25–21	25–17	23–25	25–23		98–86	280	Report
11 Sep	21:00	Slovakia	0–3	Slovenia	29–31	15–25	18–25			62–81	459	Report
12 Sep	16:00	Sweden	2–3	Czech Republic	22–25	23–25	25–23	25–17	13–15	108–105	797	Report
12 Sep	21:05	Greece	0–3	Italy	23–25	23–25	16–25			62–75	4,200	Report
13 Sep	16:00	Slovenia	3–0	Sweden	25–16	25–21	25–12			75–49	850	Report
13 Sep	21:05	Italy	3–1	Slovakia	25–17	25–27	25–10	25–19		100–73	4,392	Report
14 Sep	16:00	Slovakia	0–3	Czech Republic	21–25	14–25	20–25			55–75	414	Report
14 Sep	21:00	Slovenia	1–3	Greece	18–25	25–19	23–25	20–25		86–94	511	Report
15 Sep	16:00	Greece	3–1	Sweden	25–23	25–21	17–25	25–20		92–89	398	Report
15 Sep	21:05	Czech Republic	1–3	Italy	25–23	16–25	20–25	20–25		81–98	4,487	Report
16 Sep	16:00	Sweden	3–1	Slovakia	19–25	25–23	25–21	25–19		94–88	351	Report
16 Sep	21:00	Czech Republic	1–3	Slovenia	26–24	13–25	25–27	23–25		87–101	630	Report
17 Sep	16:00	Slovakia	1–3	Greece	17–25	25–21	22–25	17–25		81–96	275	Report
17 Sep	21:05	Italy	3–2	Slovenia	25–19	25–22	27–29	19–25	15–9	111–104	4,798	Report

=== Pool B ===
Pos	Team	Pld	W	L	Pts	SW	SL	SR	SPW	SPL	SPR	Qualification
1	Poland	5	4	1	13	14	3	4.667	420	319	1.317	Round of 16
2	Ukraine	5	4	1	12	12	5	2.400	398	360	1.106	Round of 16
3	Bulgaria (H)	5	4	1	11	13	6	2.167	454	408	1.113	Round of 16
4	Portugal	5	1	4	4	5	12	0.417	335	382	0.877	Round of 16
5	North Macedonia	5	1	4	3	3	12	0.250	284	366	0.776	
6	Israel	5	1	4	2	5	14	0.357	388	444	0.874	

Source: CEV
(H) Host

Date	Time		Score		Set 1	Set 2	Set 3	Set 4	Set 5	Total	Attd	Report
9 Sep	19:00	Bulgaria	3–0	North Macedonia	25–17	25–19	25–18			75–54	8,892	Report
10 Sep	16:00	Poland	3–0	Portugal	25–12	25–18	25–20			75–50	867	Report
10 Sep	19:00	Israel	1–3	Ukraine	22–25	19–25	25–22	19–25		85–97	289	Report
11 Sep	16:00	Ukraine	3–0	North Macedonia	25–22	25–22	25–10			75–54	453	Report
11 Sep	19:00	Portugal	0–3	Bulgaria	18–25	18–25	20–25			56–75	10,678	Report
12 Sep	16:00	Poland	3–0	Israel	25–16	25–17	25–18			75–51	1,876	Report
12 Sep	19:00	Bulgaria	1–3	Ukraine	23–25	22–25	25–21	21–25		91–96	11,689	Report
13 Sep	16:00	Portugal	2–3	Israel	25–19	20–25	25–20	22–25	7–15	99–104	288	Report
13 Sep	19:00	North Macedonia	0–3	Poland	19–25	16–25	13–25			48–75	876	Report
14 Sep	16:00	Ukraine	3–0	Portugal	25–18	25–18	25–19			75–55	257	Report
14 Sep	19:00	Bulgaria	3–1	Israel	23–25	25–22	25–15	25–20		98–82	9,865	Report
15 Sep	16:00	North Macedonia	0–3	Portugal	13–25	20–25	20–25			53–75	59	Report
15 Sep	19:00	Poland	3–0	Ukraine	25–20	25–13	25–22			75–55	1,314	Report
16 Sep	16:00	Israel	0–3	North Macedonia	21–25	23–25	22–25			66–75	657	Report
16 Sep	19:00	Poland	2–3	Bulgaria	25–20	29–31	23–25	25–19	18–20	120–115	13,186	Report

=== Pool C ===
Pos	Team	Pld	W	L	Pts	SW	SL	SR	SPW	SPL	SPR	Qualification
1	Belgium	5	4	1	13	14	6	2.333	454	401	1.132	Round of 16
2	Finland (H)	5	4	1	11	14	7	2.000	472	431	1.095	Round of 16
3	Serbia	5	3	2	7	9	11	0.818	442	463	0.955	Round of 16
4	Denmark	5	2	3	7	9	9	1.000	407	396	1.028	Round of 16
5	Estonia	5	2	3	5	8	12	0.667	440	472	0.932	
6	Netherlands	5	0	5	2	6	15	0.400	433	485	0.893	

Source: CEV
(H) Host

Date	Time		Score		Set 1	Set 2	Set 3	Set 4	Set 5	Total	Attd	Report
10 Sep	20:00	Finland	3–0	Denmark	25–22	25–17	25–20			75–59	6,583	Report
11 Sep	17:00	Netherlands	1–3	Belgium	14–25	25–18	17–25	14–25		70–93	1,753	Report
11 Sep	20:00	Serbia	3–1	Estonia	25–23	26–24	26–28	25–22		102–97	2,203	Report
12 Sep	15:00	Denmark	3–0	Netherlands	25–17	25–20	25–20			75–57	6,124	Report
12 Sep	18:00	Belgium	2–3	Finland	25–23	20–25	19–25	25–23	10–15	99–111	12,338	Report
13 Sep	15:00	Estonia	0–3	Denmark	26–28	22–25	16–25			64–78	6,467	Report
13 Sep	18:00	Finland	3–0	Serbia	25–19	25–21	25–23			75–63	10,929	Report
14 Sep	17:00	Serbia	3–2	Netherlands	20–25	23–25	30–28	25–15	17–15	115–108	876	Report
14 Sep	20:00	Estonia	1–3	Belgium	17–25	25–18	21–25	14–25		77–93	1,002	Report
15 Sep	17:00	Belgium	3–1	Denmark	19–25	25–20	25–19	25–23		94–87	2,482	Report
15 Sep	20:00	Netherlands	2–3	Finland	25–18	21–25	26–24	20–25	11–15	103–107	6,106	Report
16 Sep	17:00	Denmark	2–3	Serbia	25–19	25–21	21–25	23–25	14–16	108–106	843	Report
16 Sep	20:00	Netherlands	1–3	Estonia	25–27	22–25	25–18	23–25		95–95	1,023	Report
17 Sep	17:00	Serbia	0–3	Belgium	19–25	21–25	16–25			56–75	3,018	Report
17 Sep	20:00	Finland	2–3	Estonia	25–22	21–25	22–25	25–20	11–15	104–107	9,813	Report

=== Pool D ===
Pos	Team	Pld	W	L	Pts	SW	SL	SR	SPW	SPL	SPR	Qualification
1	France	5	4	1	13	14	4	3.500	445	370	1.203	Round of 16
2	Germany	5	4	1	11	12	7	1.714	429	408	1.051	Round of 16
3	Romania (H)	5	3	2	9	12	10	1.200	501	486	1.031	Round of 16
4	Latvia	5	2	3	6	8	11	0.727	405	446	0.908	Round of 16
5	Turkey	5	1	4	3	6	12	0.500	392	429	0.914	
6	Switzerland	5	1	4	3	5	13	0.385	396	429	0.923	

Source: CEV
(H) Host

Date	Time		Score		Set 1	Set 2	Set 3	Set 4	Set 5	Total	Attd	Report
9 Sep	20:00	Romania	1–3	Latvia	24–26	25–18	21–25	24–26		94–95	1,750	Report
10 Sep	17:00	France	3–0	Switzerland	25–23	31–29	25–21			81–73	700	Report
10 Sep	20:00	Turkey	1–3	Germany	25–23	22–25	21–25	19–25		87–98	1,200	Report
11 Sep	17:00	Germany	3–0	Latvia	25–20	25–20	25–16			75–56	1,200	Report
11 Sep	20:00	Switzerland	1–3	Romania	21–25	23–25	25–13	20–25		89–88	3,127	Report
12 Sep	17:00	France	3–0	Turkey	25–19	25–20	25–19			75–58	1,350	Report
12 Sep	20:00	Romania	2–3	Germany	22–25	23–25	25–22	25–15	13–15	108–102	4,382	Report
13 Sep	17:00	Switzerland	0–3	Turkey	23–25	19–25	19–25			61–75	600	Report
13 Sep	20:00	Latvia	1–3	France	12–25	16–25	25–22	13–25		66–97	650	Report
14 Sep	17:00	Germany	3–1	Switzerland	25–19	25–17	22–25	25–21		97–82	400	Report
14 Sep	20:00	Romania	3–1	Turkey	25–19	25–21	20–25	25–18		95–83	3,875	Report
15 Sep	17:00	Latvia	1–3	Switzerland	22–25	19–25	25–16	22–25		88–91	400	Report
15 Sep	20:00	France	3–0	Germany	25–21	25–17	25–19			75–57	650	Report
16 Sep	17:00	Turkey	1–3	Latvia	24–26	25–23	24–26	16–25		89–100	600	Report
16 Sep	20:00	France	2–3	Romania	25–16	27–25	20–25	33–35	12–15	117–116	5,350	Report

== Final round ==
Finland against Italy

- All times are local.

Round of 16
20 September – Turin
Italy	3
Denmark	0
20 September – Turin
Finland	3
Greece	2
20 September – Sofia
France	3
Portugal	0
20 September – Sofia
Ukraine	0
Romania	3
21 September – Turin
Belgium	3
Czechia	1
21 September – Turin
Slovenia	3
Serbia	0
19 September – Sofia
Poland	3
Latvia	0
19 September – Sofia
Germany	3
Bulgaria	2

Quarterfinals
23 September – Turin
Italy	2
Finland	3
22 September – Sofia
France	3
Romania	0
23 September – Turin
Belgium	1
Slovenia	3
22 September – Sofia
Poland	3
Germany	0

Semifinals
25 September – Milan
Finland	1
France	3
25 September – Milan
Slovenia	0
Poland	3

Final
26 September – Milan
France	1
Poland	3
3rd place match
26 September – Milan
Finland	3
Slovenia	0

=== Round of 16 ===
Date	Time		Score		Set 1	Set 2	Set 3	Set 4	Set 5	Total	Attd	Report
19 Sep	16:00	Poland	3–0	Latvia	25–17	25–16	25–16			75–49	1,376	Report
19 Sep	19:00	Germany	3–2	Bulgaria	21–25	21–25	25–19	25–23	15–12	107–104	12,198	Report
20 Sep	16:00	Ukraine	0–3	Romania	22–25	21–25	28–30			71–80	544	Report
20 Sep	16:00	Finland	3–2	Greece	22–25	25–16	22–25	25–23	15–13	109–102	2,861	Report
20 Sep	19:00	France	3–0	Portugal	25–21	25–22	25–21			75–64	644	Report
20 Sep	21:05	Italy	3–0	Denmark	25–22	25–16	25–11			75–49	7,580	Report
21 Sep	16:00	Belgium	3–1	Czech Republic	20–25	26–24	25–14	25–15		96–78	1,021	Report
21 Sep	21:00	Slovenia	3–0	Serbia	25–14	25–13	25–22			75–49	1,153	Report

=== Quarterfinals ===
Date	Time		Score		Set 1	Set 2	Set 3	Set 4	Set 5	Total	Attd	Report
22 Sep	16:00	France	3–0	Romania	25–16	25–19	25–19			75–54	2,844	Report
22 Sep	19:00	Poland	3–0	Germany	25–23	25–17	25–17			75–57	7,174	Report
23 Sep	16:00	Belgium	1–3	Slovenia	22–25	22–25	25–20	13–25		82–95	2,447	Report
23 Sep	21:05	Italy	2–3	Finland	25–21	26–28	16–25	25–20	13–15	105–109	8,260	Report

=== Semifinals ===
Date	Time		Score		Set 1	Set 2	Set 3	Set 4	Set 5	Total	Attd	Report
25 Sep	17:00	Slovenia	0–3	Poland	23–25	23–25	18–25			64–75	7,054	Report
25 Sep	21:00	Finland	1–3	France	17–25	25–18	18–25	15–25		75–93	5,845	Report

=== 3rd place match ===
Date	Time		Score		Set 1	Set 2	Set 3	Set 4	Set 5	Total	Attd	Report
26 Sep	17:00	Finland	3–0	Slovenia	25–23	25–20	29–27			79–70	5,881	Report

=== Final ===
Date	Time		Score		Set 1	Set 2	Set 3	Set 4	Set 5	Total	Attd	Report
26 Sep	21:00	France	1–3	Poland	29–31	19–25	25–20	16–25		89–101	11,118	Report

== Final standings ==
Pos	Team	Pld	W	L	Pts	SW	SL	SR	SPW	SPL	SPR	Qualification
1st place, gold medalist(s)	Poland	9	8	1	25	26	4	6.500	746	578	1.291	Qualified for the 2027 World Cup as hosts, 2028 Summer Olympics, and 2028 European Championship
2nd place, silver medalist(s)	France	9	7	2	22	24	8	3.000	777	664	1.170	Qualified for the 2027 World Cup
3rd place, bronze medalist(s)	Finland (H)	9	7	2	18	24	14	1.714	844	801	1.054	Qualified for the 2027 World Cup
4	Slovenia	9	5	4	16	18	14	1.286	751	688	1.092	Qualified for the 2027 World Cup
5	Italy (H)	7	6	1	18	20	7	2.857	639	538	1.188	Qualified for the 2027 World Cup as defending champions
6	Belgium	7	5	2	16	18	10	1.800	632	574	1.101	
7	Germany	7	5	2	13	15	12	1.250	593	587	1.010	
8	Romania (H)	7	4	3	12	15	13	1.154	635	632	1.005	
9	Bulgaria (H)	6	4	2	12	15	9	1.667	558	515	1.083	
10	Ukraine	6	4	2	12	12	8	1.500	469	440	1.066	
11	Greece	6	3	3	10	12	12	1.000	532	538	0.989	
12	Czech Republic	6	3	3	8	12	12	1.000	524	544	0.963	
13	Serbia	6	3	3	7	9	14	0.643	491	538	0.913	
14	Denmark	6	2	4	7	9	12	0.750	456	471	0.968	
15	Latvia	6	2	4	6	8	14	0.571	454	521	0.871	
16	Portugal	6	1	5	4	5	15	0.333	399	457	0.873	
17	Estonia	5	2	3	5	8	12	0.667	440	472	0.932	
18	Sweden	5	1	4	4	6	13	0.462	400	435	0.920	
19	Turkey	5	1	4	3	6	12	0.500	392	429	0.914	
20	North Macedonia	5	1	4	3	3	12	0.250	284	366	0.776	
21	Switzerland	5	1	4	3	5	13	0.385	396	429	0.923	
22	Israel	5	1	4	2	5	14	0.357	388	444	0.874	
23	Netherlands	5	0	5	2	6	15	0.400	433	485	0.893	
24	Slovakia	5	0	5	0	3	15	0.200	359	446	0.805	

Source: CEV
(H) Host

== Awards ==
2026 Men's European Volleyball champions

Poland
Third title

The following awards were awarded at the conclusion of the tournament:

- Most valuable player
  (Poland) Wilfredo León
- Best setter
  (France) Antoine Brizard
- Best outside hitters
  (Poland) Wilfredo León
  (Finland) Nooa Marttila
- Best middle blockers
  (Poland) Bartłomiej Lemański
  (Poland) Szymon Jakubiszak
- Best opposite spiker
  (France) Théo Faure
- Best libero
  (Poland) Jakub Popiwczak
- Best coach
  (Serbia) Nikola Grbić

== Statistics ==
=== Tournament venues attendance ===
Venue	Total	Avr	Games
(Bulgaria) Arena 8888	86,026	4,097	21
(Finland) Nokia Arena	71,560	4,771	15
(Italy) Unipol Forum	29,898	7,475	4
(Italy) Palavela	23,322	3,887	6
(Italy) Piazza del Plebiscito	5,914	5,914	1
(Italy) PalaPanini	22,842	1,632	14
(Romania) BTarena	26,234	1,749	15

== See also ==
- 2026 AVC Men's Volleyball Continental Championship
- 2026 Men's NORCECA Volleyball Championship
- 2026 Men's African Nations Volleyball Championship
- 2026 Men's South American Volleyball Championship
- 2026 Men's European Volleyball League
- 2026 Men's U22 European Volleyball Championship
- 2026 Men's U18 European Volleyball Championship
