= Adriano Xavier =

Brazilian volleyball player (born 2002)

Personal information
- Full name: Adriano Fernandes Procópio Xavier Cavalcante
- Nationality: Brazilian
- Born: 6 February 2002 (age 24)
- Height: 201 cm (6 ft 7 in)
Honours
Men's volleyball
Representing Brazil
FIVB Nations League
Bronze medal – third place	2025 Ningbo

Adriano Fernandes Procópio Xavier Cavalcante (born 6 February 2002) is a Brazilian volleyball player. He represented Brazil at the 2024 Summer Olympics.
