= Alexandros Mylonakis =

Greek volleyball referee (born 1973)

Personal information
- Nationality: Greek
- Born: 12 June 1973 (age 53) Athens

Alexandros Mylonakis (Greek: Αλέξανδρος Μυλωνάκης, born 1973) is a Greek volleyball referee, who is a CEV international referee and has officiated matches in European and international competitions.

== Career ==
He started his refereeing career in 2000 in Greece. He became an international CEV referee in year 2007. Since then, Mylonakis has received several appointments in CEV European Golden League and subsequent CEV club competitions.

In April 2017, Mylonakis served as first referee in the second leg of the men's CEV Cup final between Tours VB and Diatec Trentino.

In 2021, Mylonakis was selected as a referee for the 2021 Women's European Volleyball Championship, where he officiated matches during the group stage in Belgrade. In October 2025, he was appointed first referee for the men's CEV Champions League qualifying match between Azerrail Baku and OK Radnički Kragujevac.

In September 2026, he was invited and officiated several matches at the Men's European Volleyball Championships,, and also, Mylonakis served as the first referee for the 2026 Men's European Volleyball Championship semi-final game between Finland and France in Milan, Italy.
