= 2027 FIVB Men's Volleyball World Cup =

Volleyball tournament in Poland

Mistrzostwa Świata w Piłce Siatkowej Mężczyzn 2027 (Polish)

Tournament details
- Host country: Poland
- Cities: Gdańsk/Sopot; Łódź; Olsztyn; Kraków; Katowice
- Dates: 9–26 September
- Teams: 32 (from 5 confederations)
- Venue: 5 (in 5 host cities)

The 2027 FIVB Men's Volleyball World Cup is the 22nd staging of the FIVB Men's Volleyball World Cup, contested by the senior men's national teams of the members of the Fédération Internationale de Volleyball (FIVB). It will be held in Poland for the fourth time in the competitions' history from 9 to 26 September 2027, and the second edition under the two-year cycles in odd-numbered years with an expanded format featuring 32 teams.

This will be the first edition since the tournament was rebranded the World Cup, after the FIVB adopted the name on 5 March 2026.

Italy are the two-time defending champions.

== Host selection ==
The bidding procedure to host the 2025 and 2027 FIVB World Championships began in August 2023. National federations had until 31 August 2023 to register interest. In September 2023, the Polish prime minister Mateusz Morawiecki, announced that Poland won the hosting rights. However, it took two years for the FIVB to officially confirm Poland as hosts, with it becoming official on 26 September 2025 at FIVB meeting in Manila.

== Qualification ==
The host country Poland qualified for the competition as well as the defending champions Italy. The top three teams from each of the 2026 Continental Championships secured qualification. The final 15 places belonged to top 15 teams as per FIVB World Rankings (16 October 2026) who had not yet qualified.

| Team | Method of qualification | Date of qualification | Appearance(s) | | | | Previous best performance (Note: Bold text indicates they hosted that edition.) |
| Team | Method of qualification | Date of qualification | Total | First | Last | Streak | Previous best performance |
|---|---|---|---|---|---|---|---|
| Poland | Hosts | 27 September 2023 | 19th | 1949 | 2025 | 9 | **Champions** (1974, **2014**, 2018) |
| Italy | Defending champions | 28 September 2025 | 19th | 1949 | 2025 | 18 | **Champions** (1990, 1994, 1998, 2022, 2025) |
| Japan | 2026 AVC champions | 12 September 2026 | 18th | 1960 | 2025 | 4 | 3rd place (1970, 1974) |
| Iran | 2026 AVC runners-up | 12 September 2026 | 9th | 1970 | 2025 | 7 | 6th place (2014) |
| South Korea | 2026 AVC 3rd placers | 13 September 2026 | 11th | 1956 | 2025 | 2 | 4th place (1978) |
| United States | 2026 NORCECA champions | 15 September 2026 | 19th | 1956 | 2025 | 17 | **Champions** (1986) |
| Canada | 2026 NORCECA runners-up | 15 September 2026 | 14th | 1974 | 2025 | 11 | 9th place (1994, 2018) |
| Cuba | 2026 NORCECA 3rd placers | 16 September 2026 | 18th | 1956 | 2025 | 17 | Runners-up (1990, 2010) |
| Brazil | 2026 CSV champions | 19 September 2026 | 20th | 1956 | 2025 | 20 | **Champions** (2002, 2006, 2010) |
| Argentina | 2026 CSV runners-up | 19 September 2026 | 15th | 1960 | 2025 | 14 | 3rd place (**1982**) |
| Chile | 2026 CSV 3rd placers | 20 September 2026 | 3rd | 1982 | 2025 | 2 | 23rd place (1982) |
| France | 2026 CEV runners-up | 22 September 2026 | 19th | 1949 | 2025 | 8 | 3rd place (2002) |
| Finland | 2026 CEV 3rd placers | 23 September 2026 | 10th | 1952 | 2025 | 2 | 9th place (2014) |
| Slovenia (Note: As Poland automatically qualified as hosts, its qualification spot was reallocated to Slovenia after they finished the 2026 CEV Championship in fourth place.) | 2026 CEV 4th placers | 23 September 2026 | 4th | 2018 | 2025 | 4 | 4th place (2022) |
| Tunisia | 2026 CAVB champions | 23 September 2026 | 12th | 1970 | 2025 | 8 | 12th place (2025) |
| Cameroon | 2026 CAVB runners-up | 23 September 2026 | 6th | 1990 | 2022 | 1 | 13th place (2014) |
| Algeria | 2026 CAVB 3rd placers | 25 September 2026 | 4th | 1994 | 2025 | 2 | 13th place (1994) |
| Bulgaria | 1st World ranked non-qualified team | 16 October 2026 | 21st | 1949 | 2025 | 18 | Runners-up (**1970**, 2025) |
| Germany (Note: Competed as East Germany from 1956 to 1982 (7 times) and as West Germany from 1956 to 1990 (2 times); 7 appearances as Germany.) | 2nd World ranked non-qualified team | 16 October 2026 | 14th | 1956 | 2025 | 3 | **Champions** (1970) |
| Ukraine | 3rd World ranked non-qualified team | 16 October 2026 | 4th | 1998 | 2025 | 3 | 7th place (2022) |
| Belgium | 4th World ranked non-qualified team | 16 October 2026 | 11th | 1949 | 2025 | 2 | 7th place (2025) |
| Turkey | 5th World ranked non-qualified team | 16 October 2026 | 6th | 1956 | 2025 | 3 | 6th place (2025) |
| Serbia (Note: Competed as SFR Yugoslavia from 1956 to 1970 (4 times) and as Serbia and Montenegro from 1998 to 2006 (3 times).) | 6th World ranked non-qualified team | 16 October 2026 | 13th | 1956 | 2025 | 9 | Runners-up (1998) |
| Czech Republic (Note: Competed as Czechoslovakia from 1949 to 1990 (12 times); 6 appearances as Czech Republic.) | 7th World ranked non-qualified team | 16 October 2026 | 18th | 1949 | 2025 | 2 | **Champions** (1956, **1966**) |
| Greece | 8th World ranked non-qualified team | 16 October 2026 | 6th | 1986 | 2006 | 1 | 6th place (**1994**) |
| Romania | 9th World ranked non-qualified team | 16 October 2026 | 12th | 1949 | 2025 | 2 | 3rd place (1960, 1962) |
| Netherlands | 10th World ranked non-qualified team | 16 October 2026 | 15th | 1949 | 2025 | 4 | Runner-up (1994) |
| Mexico | 11th World ranked non-qualified team | 16 October 2026 | 7th | 1974 | 2022 | 1 | 10th place (**1974**) |
| Puerto Rico | 12th World ranked non-qualified team | 16 October 2026 | 7th | 1974 | 2022 | 1 | 12th place (2006) |
| Denmark | 13th World ranked non-qualified team | 16 October 2026 | 2nd | 1966 | 1966 | 1 | 22nd place (1966) |
| Egypt | 14th World ranked non-qualified team | 16 October 2026 | 12th | 1974 | 2025 | 9 | 13th place (2010) |
| Estonia | 15th World ranked non-qualified team | 16 October 2026 | 1st | Debut | | 1 | —N/a |

== Format ==
The tournament will be played in two rounds: a preliminary round (pool phase) and a final round (direct elimination phase). During the preliminary round, 32 qualified teams were divided into eight pools, labeled A through H, with four teams in each pool. In this phase, every team within a pool will compete against the other three teams once. After the pool phase, the top two teams from each pool will advance to the final round, creating a round of 16 teams. Simultaneously, the bottom two teams from each pool will be ranked from 17th to 32nd based on the Team Combined Ranking System.

The final round will follow a single-elimination format with the round of 16 match-ups determined by each team's pool and ranking position. The initial pairings—A1 versus H2, H1 versus A2, D1 versus E2, E1 versus D2, B1 versus G2, G1 versus B2, C1 versus F2, and F1 versus B2—ensures that the teams from pools A, D, E, and H will not encounter the teams from pools B, C, F, and G until the third place or the final match. As the competition progresses, the round of 16 losers will be ranked from 9th to 16th according to the Team Combined Ranking System, while the winners will advance to the quarterfinals. The quarterfinals will follow the same pattern, with losing teams ranked from 5th to 8th, and victorious teams moving to the next stage of the competition. In the semifinals, the losers will compete for the third place, while the winners will face each other in the final match.

== Venues ==
On 16 October 2025, it was announced that Ergo Arena in Gdańsk and Sopot would host. On 4 November 2025, Hala Urania in Olsztyn was announced as a venue. On 21 November 2025, it was announced that Atlas Arena in Łódź would host. On 18 December 2025, Spodek in Katowice was announced as a venue. On 2 March 2026, it was announced that Tauron Arena Kraków would host the final round.

| Gdańsk/Sopot | Katowice | Kraków | Łódź | Olsztyn |
|---|---|---|---|---|
| Ergo Arena | Spodek | Tauron Arena Kraków | Atlas Arena | Hala Urania |
| Capacity: 11,409 | Capacity: 11,036 | Capacity: 15,030 | Capacity: 13,805 | Capacity: 4,046 |

== Pools composition ==
=== Seeding ===
Teams were seeded using the FIVB World Rankings on October 16, 2026 (shown in parentheses).

The host and the top seven teams are automatically seeded as the first teams of the eight pools

| Seeded teams | Pot 1 | Pot 2 | Pot 3 |
|---|---|---|---|
| Poland (1) (Hosts); Italy (2); United States (4); Japan (5); Brazil (6); Slovenia (7); France (8); Bulgaria (9) | Finland (10); Germany (11); Ukraine (12); Cuba (13); Argentina (14); Belgium (15); Canada (16); Turkey (17) | Serbia (18); Iran (19); Czech Republic (20); Greece (21); Romania (22); Netherlands (23); Mexico (24); South Korea (25) | Puerto Rico (26); Denmark (27); Chile (28); Egypt (29); Estonia (30); Tunisia (31); Cameroon (49); Algeria (77) |

=== Draw ===
The draw will take place on December 3, 2026, in Wieliczka Salt Mine.
