= Jānis Medenis =

Latvian poet and writer

- Born: May 31, 1903; Prauliena Parish (now Madona Municipality), Kreis Wenden, Governorate of Livonia (now Latvia)
- Died: May 10, 1961 (aged 57); Murjāņi, Latvian SSR (now Latvia)
- Occupations: Poet, writer
- Writing career
- Genre: Poetry

Jānis Medenis (May 31, 1903 – May 10, 1961) was a Latvian poet and writer. In 1948, he was convicted of anti-Soviet activities, and imprisoned in the Norillag camp, later in Irkutsk Oblast until 1955.
