= Volleyball at the 2016 Summer Olympics – Men's team rosters =

This article shows the rosters of all participating teams at the men's indoor volleyball tournament at the 2016 Summer Olympics in Rio de Janeiro.

== Pool A ==
=== Brazil ===
The following is the Brazil roster in the men's volleyball tournament of the 2016 Summer Olympics.

Head coach: Bernardo Rezende

No.	Name	Date of birth	Height	Weight	Spike	Block	2015–16 club
1	Bruno Rezende (c)	2 July 1986	1.90 m (6 ft 3 in)	76 kg (168 lb)	323 cm (127 in)	302 cm (119 in)	(Italy) DHL Modena
3	Éder Carbonera	19 October 1983	2.05 m (6 ft 9 in)	107 kg (236 lb)	360 cm (140 in)	330 cm (130 in)	(Brazil) Funvic Taubaté
4	Wallace de Souza	26 June 1987	1.98 m (6 ft 6 in)	87 kg (192 lb)	344 cm (135 in)	318 cm (125 in)	(Brazil) Sada Cruzeiro
7	William Arjona	31 July 1979	1.85 m (6 ft 1 in)	78 kg (172 lb)	300 cm (120 in)	295 cm (116 in)	(Brazil) Sada Cruzeiro
10	Sérgio Santos (L)	15 October 1975	1.84 m (6 ft 0 in)	78 kg (172 lb)	325 cm (128 in)	310 cm (120 in)	(Brazil) SESI São Paulo
12	Luiz Felipe Fonteles	19 June 1984	1.96 m (6 ft 5 in)	89 kg (196 lb)	330 cm (130 in)	320 cm (130 in)	(Brazil) Funvic Taubaté
13	Maurício Souza	29 September 1988	2.09 m (6 ft 10 in)	93 kg (205 lb)	344 cm (135 in)	323 cm (127 in)	(Brazil) Funvic Taubaté
14	Douglas Souza	20 August 1995	1.99 m (6 ft 6 in)	75 kg (165 lb)	338 cm (133 in)	317 cm (125 in)	(Brazil) SESI São Paulo
16	Lucas Saatkamp	6 March 1986	2.09 m (6 ft 10 in)	101 kg (223 lb)	340 cm (130 in)	321 cm (126 in)	(Italy) DHL Modena
17	Evandro Guerra	27 December 1981	2.07 m (6 ft 9 in)	103 kg (227 lb)	359 cm (141 in)	332 cm (131 in)	(Japan) Suntory Sunbirds
18	Ricardo Lucarelli	14 February 1992	1.95 m (6 ft 5 in)	79 kg (174 lb)	338 cm (133 in)	308 cm (121 in)	(Brazil) Funvic Taubaté
19	Maurício Borges Silva	4 February 1989	1.99 m (6 ft 6 in)	99 kg (218 lb)	335 cm (132 in)	315 cm (124 in)	(Turkey) Arkas İzmir

=== Canada ===
The following was the Canada roster in the men's volleyball tournament of the 2016 Summer Olympics. The team was announced officially on July 22, 2016.

Head coach: Glenn Hoag

No.	Name	Date of birth	Height	Weight	Spike	Block	2015–16 club
1	TJ Sanders	14 December 1991	1.91 m (6 ft 3 in)	81 kg (179 lb)	326 cm (128 in)	308 cm (121 in)	(Poland) MKS Będzin
2	John Gordon Perrin	17 August 1989	2.01 m (6 ft 7 in)	95 kg (209 lb)	353 cm (139 in)	329 cm (130 in)	(Poland) Asseco Resovia Rzeszów
4	Nicholas Hoag	19 August 1992	2.00 m (6 ft 7 in)	91 kg (201 lb)	342 cm (135 in)	322 cm (127 in)	(France) Paris Volley
5	Rudy Verhoeff	24 June 1989	1.98 m (6 ft 6 in)	88 kg (194 lb)	349 cm (137 in)	317 cm (125 in)	(Germany) Powervolleys Düren
6	Justin Duff	10 May 1988	2.00 m (6 ft 7 in)	102 kg (225 lb)	370 cm (150 in)	335 cm (132 in)	(Portugal) SL Benfica
11	Daniel Jansen Van Doorn	21 March 1990	2.07 m (6 ft 9 in)	98 kg (216 lb)	351 cm (138 in)	328 cm (129 in)	(Greece) Pamvohaikos Vocha
12	Gavin Schmitt	27 January 1986	2.08 m (6 ft 10 in)	106 kg (234 lb)	372 cm (146 in)	340 cm (130 in)	(Brazil) Funvic Taubaté
15	Fred Winters (c)	25 September 1982	1.95 m (6 ft 5 in)	98 kg (216 lb)	359 cm (141 in)	327 cm (129 in)	(Brazil) Sada Cruzeiro
17	Graham Vigrass	17 June 1989	2.05 m (6 ft 9 in)	97 kg (214 lb)	354 cm (139 in)	330 cm (130 in)	(Turkey) Arkas İzmir
19	Blair Cameron Bann (L)	26 February 1988	1.84 m (6 ft 0 in)	84 kg (185 lb)	314 cm (124 in)	295 cm (116 in)	(Germany) Powervolleys Düren
21	Jay Blankenau	27 September 1989	1.94 m (6 ft 4 in)	94 kg (207 lb)	334 cm (131 in)	307 cm (121 in)	(Netherlands) Abiant Lycurgus
22	Steven Marshall	23 November 1989	1.93 m (6 ft 4 in)	87 kg (192 lb)	350 cm (140 in)	322 cm (127 in)	(Germany) SVG Lüneburg

=== France ===
The following is the France roster in the men's volleyball tournament of the 2016 Summer Olympics.

Head coach: Laurent Tillie

No.	Name	Date of birth	Height	Weight	Spike	Block	2015–16 club
2	Jenia Grebennikov (L)	13 August 1990	1.88 m (6 ft 2 in)	85 kg (187 lb)	345 cm (136 in)	330 cm (130 in)	(Italy) Cucine Lube Civitanova
4	Antonin Rouzier	18 August 1986	2.00 m (6 ft 7 in)	102 kg (225 lb)	350 cm (140 in)	330 cm (130 in)	(Turkey) Arkas İzmir
5	Trévor Clévenot	28 June 1994	1.99 m (6 ft 6 in)	89 kg (196 lb)	335 cm (132 in)	316 cm (124 in)	(France) Spacer's Toulouse
6	Benjamin Toniutti (c)	30 October 1989	1.83 m (6 ft 0 in)	73 kg (161 lb)	320 cm (130 in)	300 cm (120 in)	(Poland) ZAKSA Kędzierzyn-Koźle
7	Kévin Tillie	2 November 1990	2.00 m (6 ft 7 in)	85 kg (187 lb)	345 cm (136 in)	325 cm (128 in)	(Poland) ZAKSA Kędzierzyn-Koźle
9	Earvin N'Gapeth	12 February 1991	1.94 m (6 ft 4 in)	101 kg (223 lb)	358 cm (141 in)	327 cm (129 in)	(Italy) DHL Modena
10	Kévin Le Roux	11 May 1989	2.09 m (6 ft 10 in)	98 kg (216 lb)	365 cm (144 in)	345 cm (136 in)	(Turkey) Halkbank Ankara
13	Pierre Pujol	13 July 1984	1.86 m (6 ft 1 in)	90 kg (200 lb)	335 cm (132 in)	315 cm (124 in)	(France) AS Cannes
14	Nicolas Le Goff	15 February 1992	2.06 m (6 ft 9 in)	115 kg (254 lb)	365 cm (144 in)	328 cm (129 in)	(Germany) Berlin Recycling Volleys
16	Nicolas Maréchal	4 March 1987	1.98 m (6 ft 6 in)	93 kg (205 lb)	338 cm (133 in)	327 cm (129 in)	(Poland) PGE Skra Bełchatów
17	Franck Lafitte	8 March 1989	2.03 m (6 ft 8 in)	94 kg (207 lb)	350 cm (140 in)	330 cm (130 in)	(France) Arago de Sète
18	Thibault Rossard	28 August 1993	1.93 m (6 ft 4 in)	85 kg (187 lb)	350 cm (140 in)	320 cm (130 in)	(France) Arago de Sète

=== Italy ===
The following is the Italy roster in the men's volleyball tournament of the 2016 Summer Olympics.

Head coach: Gianlorenzo Blengini

No.	Name	Date of birth	Height	Weight	Spike	Block	2015–16 club
3	Daniele Sottile	17 August 1979	1.86 m (6 ft 1 in)	73 kg (161 lb)	332 cm (131 in)	310 cm (120 in)	(Italy) Ninfa Latina
4	Luca Vettori	26 April 1991	2.00 m (6 ft 7 in)	95 kg (209 lb)	345 cm (136 in)	323 cm (127 in)	(Italy) DHL Modena
5	Osmany Juantorena	12 August 1985	2.00 m (6 ft 7 in)	85 kg (187 lb)	370 cm (150 in)	340 cm (130 in)	(Italy) Cucine Lube Civitanova
6	Simone Giannelli	9 August 1996	1.98 m (6 ft 6 in)	92 kg (203 lb)	342 cm (135 in)	265 cm (104 in)	(Italy) Diatec Trentino
7	Salvatore Rossini	13 July 1986	1.85 m (6 ft 1 in)	82 kg (181 lb)	312 cm (123 in)	301 cm (119 in)	(Italy) DHL Modena
9	Ivan Zaytsev	2 October 1988	2.02 m (6 ft 8 in)	92 kg (203 lb)	355 cm (140 in)	348 cm (137 in)	(Russia) Dynamo Moscow
10	Filippo Lanza	3 March 1991	1.98 m (6 ft 6 in)	98 kg (216 lb)	350 cm (140 in)	330 cm (130 in)	(Italy) Diatec Trentino
11	Simone Buti	19 September 1983	2.06 m (6 ft 9 in)	100 kg (220 lb)	346 cm (136 in)	328 cm (129 in)	(Italy) Sir Safety Conad Perugia
13	Massimo Colaci (L)	21 February 1985	1.80 m (5 ft 11 in)	75 kg (165 lb)	324 cm (128 in)	308 cm (121 in)	(Italy) Diatec Trentino
14	Matteo Piano	24 October 1990	2.08 m (6 ft 10 in)	102 kg (225 lb)	352 cm (139 in)	325 cm (128 in)	(Italy) DHL Modena
15	Emanuele Birarelli (c)	8 February 1981	2.02 m (6 ft 8 in)	95 kg (209 lb)	340 cm (130 in)	316 cm (124 in)	(Italy) Sir Safety Conad Perugia
16	Oleg Antonov	28 July 1988	1.98 m (6 ft 6 in)	88 kg (194 lb)	340 cm (130 in)	310 cm (120 in)	(Italy) Diatec Trentino

=== Mexico ===
The following is the Mexico roster in the men's volleyball tournament of the 2016 Summer Olympics.

Head coach: Jorge Azair

No.	Name	Date of birth	Height	Weight	Spike	Block	2015–16 club
1	Daniel Vargas	1 September 1986	1.97 m (6 ft 6 in)	94 kg (207 lb)	340 cm (130 in)	330 cm (130 in)	(Finland) Raision Loimu
4	Gonzalo Ruiz	24 April 1988	1.86 m (6 ft 1 in)	87 kg (192 lb)	345 cm (136 in)	325 cm (128 in)	(Mexico) IMSS ATN
5	Jesús Rangel (L)	20 September 1980	1.90 m (6 ft 3 in)	82 kg (181 lb)	337 cm (133 in)	330 cm (130 in)	(Mexico) Tigres UANL
6	Jesús Alberto Perales	22 December 1993	1.97 m (6 ft 6 in)	88 kg (194 lb)	328 cm (129 in)	304 cm (120 in)	(Mexico) Tigres UANL
7	Jorge Quiñones	13 November 1981	1.86 m (6 ft 1 in)	80 kg (180 lb)	330 cm (130 in)	325 cm (128 in)	(Mexico) Virtus Guanajuato
9	Carlos Guerra (c)	3 August 1981	1.96 m (6 ft 5 in)	95 kg (209 lb)	348 cm (137 in)	335 cm (132 in)	(Switzerland) Chênois Genève
10	Pedro Rangel	16 September 1988	1.92 m (6 ft 4 in)	85 kg (187 lb)	340 cm (130 in)	324 cm (128 in)	(Mexico) Tigres UANL
11	Jorge Barajas	7 May 1991	1.88 m (6 ft 2 in)	80 kg (180 lb)	320 cm (130 in)	317 cm (125 in)	(Mexico) Cocoteros de Colima
13	Samuel Córdova	13 March 1989	2.00 m (6 ft 7 in)	89 kg (196 lb)	353 cm (139 in)	335 cm (132 in)	(Mexico) Baja California
14	Tomás Aguilera	15 November 1988	2.02 m (6 ft 8 in)	95 kg (209 lb)	350 cm (140 in)	340 cm (130 in)	(Mexico) Chihuahua
17	Néstor Orellana	7 January 1992	1.92 m (6 ft 4 in)	84 kg (185 lb)	332 cm (131 in)	327 cm (129 in)	(Mexico) Tigres UANL
21	José Martínez	23 January 1993	2.00 m (6 ft 7 in)	100 kg (220 lb)	345 cm (136 in)	334 cm (131 in)	(Mexico) Virtus Guanajuato

=== United States ===
The following is the United States roster in the men's volleyball tournament of the 2016 Summer Olympics.

Head coach: John Speraw

No.	Name	Date of birth	Height	Weight	Spike	Block	2015–16 club
1	Matthew Anderson	18 April 1987	2.02 m (6 ft 8 in)	100 kg (220 lb)	360 cm (140 in)	332 cm (131 in)	(Russia) Zenit Kazan
2	Aaron Russell	4 June 1993	2.05 m (6 ft 9 in)	98 kg (216 lb)	360 cm (140 in)	339 cm (133 in)	(Italy) Sir Safety Conad Perugia
3	Taylor Sander	17 March 1992	1.96 m (6 ft 5 in)	80 kg (180 lb)	358 cm (141 in)	335 cm (132 in)	(Italy) Calzedonia Verona
4	David Lee (c)	8 March 1982	2.03 m (6 ft 8 in)	105 kg (231 lb)	350 cm (140 in)	325 cm (128 in)	(Greece) P.A.O.K. Thessaloniki
7	Kawika Shoji	11 November 1987	1.90 m (6 ft 3 in)	79 kg (174 lb)	331 cm (130 in)	315 cm (124 in)	(Turkey) Arkas İzmir
8	William Priddy	1 October 1977	1.94 m (6 ft 4 in)	89 kg (196 lb)	353 cm (139 in)	330 cm (130 in)	(Italy) Cucine Lube Civitanova
9	Murphy Troy	31 May 1989	2.02 m (6 ft 8 in)	99 kg (218 lb)	360 cm (140 in)	350 cm (140 in)	(Poland) Lotos Trefl Gdańsk
10	Thomas Jaeschke	4 September 1993	1.98 m (6 ft 6 in)	84 kg (185 lb)	348 cm (137 in)	330 cm (130 in)	(Poland) Asseco Resovia Rzeszów
11	Micah Christenson	8 May 1993	1.98 m (6 ft 6 in)	88 kg (194 lb)	349 cm (137 in)	340 cm (130 in)	(Italy) Cucine Lube Civitanova
17	Maxwell Holt	12 March 1987	2.05 m (6 ft 9 in)	90 kg (200 lb)	351 cm (138 in)	333 cm (131 in)	(Russia) Dynamo Moscow
20	David Smith	15 May 1985	2.01 m (6 ft 7 in)	86 kg (190 lb)	360 cm (140 in)	345 cm (136 in)	(France) Tours VB
22	Erik Shoji (L)	24 August 1989	1.84 m (6 ft 0 in)	75 kg (165 lb)	317 cm (125 in)	305 cm (120 in)	(Germany) Berlin Recycling Volleys

== Pool B ==
=== Argentina ===
The following is the Argentina roster in the men's volleyball tournament of the 2016 Summer Olympics.

Head coach: Julio Velasco

No.	Name	Date of birth	Height	Weight	Spike	Block	2015–16 club
1	Nicolás Bruno	24 February 1989	1.87 m (6 ft 2 in)	85 kg (187 lb)	338 cm (133 in)	318 cm (125 in)	(Argentina) Personal Bolívar
4	Martín Ramos	26 August 1991	1.97 m (6 ft 6 in)	94 kg (207 lb)	348 cm (137 in)	328 cm (129 in)	(Argentina) UPCN San Juan
6	Cristian Poglajen	14 July 1989	1.95 m (6 ft 5 in)	94 kg (207 lb)	342 cm (135 in)	322 cm (127 in)	(Brazil) Montes Claros Vôlei
7	Facundo Conte	25 August 1989	1.97 m (6 ft 6 in)	88 kg (194 lb)	354 cm (139 in)	344 cm (135 in)	(Poland) PGE Skra Bełchatów
8	Demián González	21 February 1983	1.92 m (6 ft 4 in)	82 kg (181 lb)	350 cm (140 in)	333 cm (131 in)	(Brazil) Brasil Kirin Campinas
10	José Luis González	27 December 1984	2.06 m (6 ft 9 in)	97 kg (214 lb)	322 cm (127 in)	302 cm (119 in)	(Poland) BBTS Bielsko-Biała
11	Sebastian Solé	12 June 1991	2.00 m (6 ft 7 in)	94 kg (207 lb)	362 cm (143 in)	342 cm (135 in)	(Italy) Diatec Trentino
12	Bruno Lima	4 February 1996	1.98 m (6 ft 6 in)	87 kg (192 lb)	345 cm (136 in)	320 cm (130 in)	(Argentina) Obras Vóley
13	Ezequiel Palacios	2 October 1992	1.98 m (6 ft 6 in)	95 kg (209 lb)	345 cm (136 in)	325 cm (128 in)	(Argentina) Club La Unión
14	Pablo Crer	12 June 1989	2.02 m (6 ft 8 in)	85 kg (187 lb)	357 cm (141 in)	337 cm (133 in)	(Argentina) Personal Bolívar
15	Luciano De Cecco (c)	2 June 1988	1.91 m (6 ft 3 in)	98 kg (216 lb)	332 cm (131 in)	315 cm (124 in)	(Italy) Sir Safety Conad Perugia
16	Alexis González (L)	21 July 1981	1.84 m (6 ft 0 in)	85 kg (187 lb)	327 cm (129 in)	310 cm (120 in)	(Argentina) Personal Bolívar

=== Cuba ===
The following is the Cuba roster in the men's volleyball tournament of the 2016 Summer Olympics.

Head coach: Nicolás Vives

No.	Name	Date of birth	Height	Weight	Spike	Block	2015–16 club
1	Yosvani González	18 April 1988	1.96 m (6 ft 5 in)	85 kg (187 lb)	345 cm (136 in)	330 cm (130 in)	(Cuba) La Habana
2	Osniel Melgarejo	18 December 1997	1.95 m (6 ft 5 in)	83 kg (183 lb)	345 cm (136 in)	320 cm (130 in)	(Cuba) Sancti Spiritus
4	Javier Jiménez (c)	16 November 1989	1.98 m (6 ft 6 in)	89 kg (196 lb)	352 cm (139 in)	345 cm (136 in)	(Greece) P.A.O.K. Thessaloniki
5	Javier Concepción	27 December 1997	2.00 m (6 ft 7 in)	84 kg (185 lb)	356 cm (140 in)	350 cm (140 in)	(Cuba) La Habana
6	Osniel Rendón	26 October 1996	2.02 m (6 ft 8 in)	90 kg (200 lb)	350 cm (140 in)	340 cm (130 in)	(Cuba) Matanzas
7	Yonder García (L)	26 March 1993	1.83 m (6 ft 0 in)	78 kg (172 lb)	325 cm (128 in)	320 cm (130 in)	(Cuba) Ciudad Habana
9	Liván Osoria	5 February 1994	2.01 m (6 ft 7 in)	96 kg (212 lb)	345 cm (136 in)	325 cm (128 in)	Santiago de Cuba
10	Darien Ferrer	31 October 1982	2.02 m (6 ft 8 in)	90 kg (200 lb)	350 cm (140 in)	348 cm (137 in)	Santiago de Cuba
13	Mario Rivera	25 October 1982	1.80 m (5 ft 11 in)	92 kg (203 lb)	343 cm (135 in)	323 cm (127 in)	(Cuba) Pinar del Río
17	Reinier Rojas	30 July 1986	1.90 m (6 ft 3 in)	78 kg (172 lb)	335 cm (132 in)	325 cm (128 in)	(Cuba) La Habana
18	Miguel Ángel López	25 March 1997	1.89 m (6 ft 2 in)	75 kg (165 lb)	345 cm (136 in)	320 cm (130 in)	(Cuba) Cienfuegos
21	Adrián Goide	26 June 1998	1.91 m (6 ft 3 in)	80 kg (180 lb)	344 cm (135 in)	340 cm (130 in)	(Cuba) Sancti Spiritus

=== Egypt ===
The following is the Egypt roster in the men's volleyball tournament of the 2016 Summer Olympics.

Head coach: Sherif El Shemerly

No.	Name	Date of birth	Height	Weight	Spike	Block	2015–16 club
3	Abou Abd Elahim	3 June 1989	2.10 m (6 ft 11 in)	88 kg (194 lb)	285 cm (112 in)	270 cm (110 in)	(Egypt) Al Ahly
4	Ahmed Abdelhay	19 August 1984	1.97 m (6 ft 6 in)	87 kg (192 lb)	342 cm (135 in)	316 cm (124 in)	(Egypt) Army
6	Mamdouh Abdelrehim	5 August 1989	2.07 m (6 ft 9 in)	90 kg (200 lb)	338 cm (133 in)	325 cm (128 in)	(Egypt) Army
7	Ashraf Abouelhassan (c)	17 May 1975	1.86 m (6 ft 1 in)	86 kg (190 lb)	325 cm (128 in)	318 cm (125 in)	(Egypt) Zamalek
8	Mohamed Thakil	12 July 1986	1.84 m (6 ft 0 in)	71 kg (157 lb)	326 cm (128 in)	315 cm (124 in)	(Egypt) Army
10	Mohamed Masoud	1 May 1994	2.11 m (6 ft 11 in)	105 kg (231 lb)	358 cm (141 in)	342 cm (135 in)	(Egypt) Smouha
11	Ahmed Afifi	30 March 1988	1.94 m (6 ft 4 in)	92 kg (203 lb)	347 cm (137 in)	342 cm (135 in)	(Egypt) Zamalek
12	Hossam Abdalla	16 February 1988	2.03 m (6 ft 8 in)	97 kg (214 lb)	343 cm (135 in)	321 cm (126 in)	(Egypt) Al Ahly
13	Mohamed Badawy	11 January 1986	1.95 m (6 ft 5 in)	91 kg (201 lb)	326 cm (128 in)	319 cm (126 in)	(Egypt) Zamalek
14	Omar Hassan	4 April 1991	1.91 m (6 ft 3 in)	104 kg (229 lb)	333 cm (131 in)	324 cm (128 in)	(Egypt) Army
15	Ahmed El-Kotb	23 July 1991	1.97 m (6 ft 6 in)	80 kg (180 lb)	328 cm (129 in)	318 cm (125 in)	(Egypt) Al Ahly
22	Ahmed Abdelaal (L)	8 June 1989	1.88 m (6 ft 2 in)	89 kg (196 lb)	0 cm (0 in)	0 cm (0 in)	(Egypt) Army

=== Iran ===
The following is the Iran roster in the men's volleyball tournament of the 2016 Summer Olympics.

Head coach: (Argentina) Raúl Lozano

No.	Name	Date of birth	Height	Weight	Spike	Block	2015–16 club
1	Shahram Mahmoudi	20 July 1988	1.98 m (6 ft 6 in)	95 kg (209 lb)	347 cm (137 in)	332 cm (131 in)	(Iran) Sarmayeh Bank Tehran
2	Milad Ebadipour	17 October 1993	1.96 m (6 ft 5 in)	78 kg (172 lb)	350 cm (140 in)	310 cm (120 in)	(Iran) Shahrdari Urmia
4	Saeid Marouf (c)	20 October 1985	1.89 m (6 ft 2 in)	81 kg (179 lb)	331 cm (130 in)	311 cm (122 in)	(Iran) Shahrdari Urmia
5	Farhad Ghaemi	28 August 1989	1.97 m (6 ft 6 in)	73 kg (161 lb)	355 cm (140 in)	335 cm (132 in)	(Iran) Paykan Tehran
6	Mohammad Mousavi	22 August 1987	2.03 m (6 ft 8 in)	86 kg (190 lb)	362 cm (143 in)	344 cm (135 in)	(Iran) Sarmayeh Bank Tehran
7	Hamzeh Zarini	18 October 1985	1.98 m (6 ft 6 in)	98 kg (216 lb)	351 cm (138 in)	330 cm (130 in)	(Iran) Kalleh Mazandaran
9	Adel Gholami	9 February 1986	1.95 m (6 ft 5 in)	88 kg (194 lb)	341 cm (134 in)	330 cm (130 in)	(Iran) Sarmayeh Bank Tehran
10	Amir Ghafour	6 June 1991	2.02 m (6 ft 8 in)	90 kg (200 lb)	354 cm (139 in)	334 cm (131 in)	(Iran) Paykan Tehran
12	Mojtaba Mirzajanpour	7 October 1991	2.05 m (6 ft 9 in)	88 kg (194 lb)	355 cm (140 in)	348 cm (137 in)	(Iran) Paykan Tehran
13	Mehdi Mahdavi	13 February 1984	1.91 m (6 ft 3 in)	96 kg (212 lb)	330 cm (130 in)	310 cm (120 in)	(Iran) Sarmayeh Bank Tehran
15	Mostafa Sharifat	16 September 1987	2.04 m (6 ft 8 in)	85 kg (187 lb)	332 cm (131 in)	313 cm (123 in)	(Iran) Matin Varamin
19	Mehdi Marandi (L)	12 May 1986	1.72 m (5 ft 8 in)	69 kg (152 lb)	295 cm (116 in)	280 cm (110 in)	(Iran) Paykan Tehran

=== Poland ===
The following is the Poland roster in the men's volleyball tournament of the 2016 Summer Olympics.

Head coach: (France) Stéphane Antiga

No.	Name	Date of birth	Height	Weight	Spike	Block	2015–16 club
1	Piotr Nowakowski	18 December 1987	2.05 m (6 ft 9 in)	90 kg (200 lb)	355 cm (140 in)	340 cm (130 in)	(Poland) Asseco Resovia Rzeszów
3	Dawid Konarski	31 August 1989	1.98 m (6 ft 6 in)	93 kg (205 lb)	353 cm (139 in)	320 cm (130 in)	(Poland) ZAKSA Kędzierzyn-Koźle
6	Bartosz Kurek	29 August 1988	2.05 m (6 ft 9 in)	87 kg (192 lb)	352 cm (139 in)	326 cm (128 in)	(Poland) Asseco Resovia Rzeszów
7	Karol Kłos	8 August 1989	2.01 m (6 ft 7 in)	87 kg (192 lb)	357 cm (141 in)	326 cm (128 in)	(Poland) PGE Skra Bełchatów
11	Fabian Drzyzga	3 January 1990	1.96 m (6 ft 5 in)	90 kg (200 lb)	325 cm (128 in)	304 cm (120 in)	(Poland) Asseco Resovia Rzeszów
12	Grzegorz Łomacz	1 October 1987	1.87 m (6 ft 2 in)	80 kg (180 lb)	335 cm (132 in)	315 cm (124 in)	(Poland) Cuprum Lubin
13	Michał Kubiak (c)	23 February 1988	1.91 m (6 ft 3 in)	80 kg (180 lb)	328 cm (129 in)	312 cm (123 in)	(Turkey) Halkbank Ankara
17	Paweł Zatorski (L)	21 June 1990	1.84 m (6 ft 0 in)	73 kg (161 lb)	328 cm (129 in)	304 cm (120 in)	(Poland) ZAKSA Kędzierzyn-Koźle
20	Mateusz Mika	21 January 1991	2.06 m (6 ft 9 in)	86 kg (190 lb)	352 cm (139 in)	320 cm (130 in)	(Poland) Lotos Trefl Gdańsk
21	Rafał Buszek	28 April 1987	1.94 m (6 ft 4 in)	81 kg (179 lb)	345 cm (136 in)	327 cm (129 in)	(Poland) ZAKSA Kędzierzyn-Koźle
22	Bartosz Bednorz	25 July 1994	2.01 m (6 ft 7 in)	84 kg (185 lb)	350 cm (140 in)	315 cm (124 in)	(Poland) Indykpol AZS Olsztyn
23	Mateusz Bieniek	5 April 1994	2.10 m (6 ft 11 in)	98 kg (216 lb)	351 cm (138 in)	326 cm (128 in)	(Poland) Effector Kielce

=== Russia ===
The following is the Russia roster in the men's volleyball tournament of the 2016 Summer Olympics.

Head coach: Vladimir Alekno

No.	Name	Date of birth	Height	Weight	Spike	Block	2015–16 club
1	Igor Kobzar	13 April 1991	1.98 m (6 ft 6 in)	86 kg (190 lb)	337 cm (133 in)	315 cm (124 in)	(Russia) Zenit Kazan
5	Sergey Grankin	21 January 1985	1.95 m (6 ft 5 in)	96 kg (212 lb)	351 cm (138 in)	320 cm (130 in)	(Russia) Dynamo Moscow
7	Dmitry Volkov	25 May 1995	2.01 m (6 ft 7 in)	88 kg (194 lb)	340 cm (130 in)	330 cm (130 in)	(Russia) Fakel Novy Urengoy
8	Sergey Tetyukhin (c)	23 September 1975	1.97 m (6 ft 6 in)	89 kg (196 lb)	345 cm (136 in)	338 cm (133 in)	(Russia) Belogorie Belgorod
11	Andrey Ashchev	10 May 1983	2.02 m (6 ft 8 in)	105 kg (231 lb)	350 cm (140 in)	338 cm (133 in)	(Russia) Zenit Kazan
12	Konstantin Bakun	15 March 1985	2.04 m (6 ft 8 in)	96 kg (212 lb)	348 cm (137 in)	325 cm (128 in)	(Russia) Gazprom-Ugra Surgut
14	Artem Volvich	22 January 1990	2.08 m (6 ft 10 in)	96 kg (212 lb)	350 cm (140 in)	330 cm (130 in)	(Russia) Lokomotiv Novosibirsk
16	Aleksey Verbov (L)	31 January 1982	1.83 m (6 ft 0 in)	79 kg (174 lb)	315 cm (124 in)	310 cm (120 in)	(Russia) Zenit Kazan
17	Maxim Mikhaylov	19 March 1988	2.02 m (6 ft 8 in)	103 kg (227 lb)	345 cm (136 in)	330 cm (130 in)	(Russia) Zenit Kazan
18	Aleksandr Volkov	14 February 1985	2.10 m (6 ft 11 in)	90 kg (200 lb)	360 cm (140 in)	335 cm (132 in)	(Russia) Ural Ufa
19	Egor Kliuka	15 June 1995	2.08 m (6 ft 10 in)	93 kg (205 lb)	360 cm (140 in)	350 cm (140 in)	(Russia) Fakel Novy Urengoy
20	Artem Ermakov	16 March 1982	1.88 m (6 ft 2 in)	80 kg (180 lb)	323 cm (127 in)	313 cm (123 in)	(Russia) Dynamo Moscow

== See also ==
- Volleyball at the 2016 Summer Olympics – Women's team rosters
