= Egyptian Men's Volleyball League =

- Current season, competition or edition: 2025–26 Egyptian Men's Volleyball League
- Sport: Volleyball
- First season: 1957; 69 years ago
- Administrator: EVF
- No. of teams: 16 teams
- Country: Egypt
- Confederation: CAVB
- Continent: Africa
- Most recent champion: Al Ahly SC (37th titles) (2025–26)
- Most titles: Al Ahly SC (37 titles)
- Level on pyramid: Level 1
- Relegation to: National 2
- Domestic cups: Egyptian Cup; Egyptian Super Cup
- International cups: CAVB African Club Championship; Arab Clubs Championship

The Egyptian Men's Volleyball Super League ( Arabic: الدوري المصري الممتاز للكرة الطائرة للرجال ) is the highest level of domestic men's club volleyball in Egypt. The competition is organized and governed by the Egyptian Volleyball Federation and features clubs from across the country.

The 2025–26 season featured 16 teams competing for the league title. Al Ahly SC has been the dominant club in the competition, with a long history of success and a record 37 Egyptian Super League titles. Zamalek SC is the second-most successful club, with 28 titles, and has been Al Ahly's main rival for domestic honours. On occasion, other clubs, such as Tala'ea El Gaish SC, have also challenged the traditional dominance of the two Cairo-based giants, winning two league titles.

== Titles by Clubs ==
Egyptian men's Volleyball League titles by club
Rank	Club	Titles
1	Al Ahly SC	37
2	Zamalek SC	28
3	Tala'ea El Gaish SC	2
4	Ibrahimia SC	1
4	Ittihad El Shorta	1

== Winners list ==
Season	Champion
1957	Ibrahimia SC
1958	Ittihad El-Shorta
1959	Zamalek
1960	Zamalek
1961	Cancelled
1962	Zamalek
1963	Zamalek
1964	Zamalek
1965	Zamalek
1966	Al Ahly
1967	Al Ahly
1968	Al Ahly
1969	Zamalek
1970	Zamalek
1971	Zamalek
1972	Zamalek
1973	Zamalek
1974	Zamalek
1975	Zamalek

Season	Champion
1976	Al Ahly
1977	Al Ahly
1978	Al Ahly
1979	Zamalek
1980	Al Ahly
1981	Al Ahly
1982	Al Ahly
1983	Al Ahly
1984	Al Ahly
1985	Al Ahly
1986	Zamalek
1987	Al Ahly
1988	Zamalek
1989	Zamalek
1990	Al Ahly
1991	Zamalek
1992	Zamalek
1993	Zamalek
1994	Al Ahly

Season	Champion
1995	Al Ahly
1996	Al Ahly
1997	Zamalek
1998	Zamalek
1999	Al Ahly
2000	Al Ahly
2001	Al Ahly
2002	Al Ahly
2003	Al Ahly
2004	Al Ahly
2005	Zamalek
2006	Al Ahly
2007	Al Ahly
2008	Zamalek
2009	Al Ahly
2010	Al Ahly
2011	Al Ahly
2012	Tala'ea El Gaish
2013	Al Ahly

Season	Champion
2014	Al Ahly
2015	Zamalek
2016	Zamalek
2017	Tala'ea El Gaish
2018	Al Ahly
2019	Al Ahly
2020	Al Ahly
2021	Al Ahly
2022	Zamalek
2023	Zamalek
2024	Al Ahly
2025	Al Ahly
2026	Al Ahly

Sources :
