= Egypt Volleyball Super Cup =

Volleyball Supercup

Egypt Volleyball Super cup
- Organising body: Egyptian Volleyball Federation
- Founded: 2002; 24 years ago
- First season: 2002
- Country: Egypt
- Number of teams: 4
- Related competitions: Egypt Volleyball League; Egyptian Volleyball Cup
- Current champions: Al Ahly SC (4th title) (2026)
- Most championships: Al Ahly SC (4 titles)

The Egypt Volleyball Super Cup is a Volleyball trophy in Egypt. The winner is decided after a competition between the four top ranking teams in Egypt volleyball league . The competition was established in 2002.

== Games ==
The following is a list of all Super Cup games. Winners are indicated in bold with the number in brackets indicating the title number.

Year	Champion	Score	Runner-up	Third place	Fourth Place	Ref.
2002	**Zamalek SC (1)**	Round Robin	Al Ahly SC			
2023	**Al Ahly SC (1)**	3-0	Zamalek SC	Ittihad Alex	Tala'ea El Gaish SC	
2024	**Al Ahly SC (2)**	3-1	Zamalek SC			
2025	**Al Ahly SC (3)**	3-2	Zamalek SC			
2026	**Al Ahly SC (4)**	3-1	Zamalek SC			
