= Mohamed Hassan (volleyball) =

Egyptian volleyball player (born 1993)

mohamed reda hassan
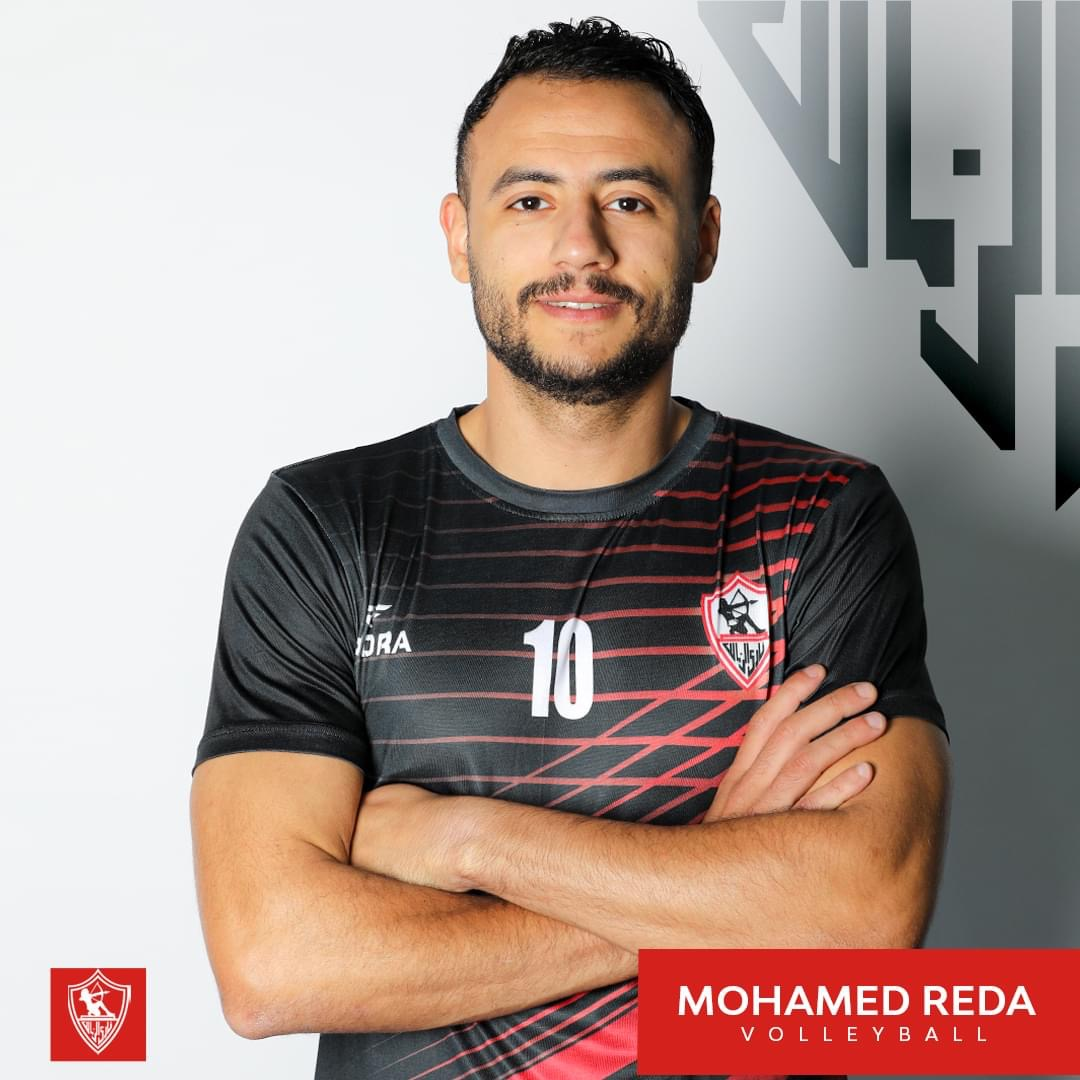

Personal information
- Full name: Mohamed Reda Abdelmaguid Hassan
- Nickname: Mohamed Reda
- Born: 28 September 1993 (age 33); Giza, Egypt
- Hometown: Cairo
- Height: 193 cm (6 ft 4 in)
- Weight: 76 kg (168 lb)
- Spike: 319 cm (126 in)
- Block: 302 cm (119 in)
- Education: Faculty of commerce cairo university

Volleyball information
- Position: Libero
- Current club: Zamalek SC
- Number: 6 (national team)

Career
Years
2003-2014
2014-2018 2018-2020
2020-2022
Teams
(Egypt) Al-Ahly SC
(Egypt) Zamalek SC (Egypt) Smouha SC
(Egypt) Zamalek SC

National team
2010–now	Egypt
Honours
Men's volleyball
Representing Egypt
FIVB Challenger Cup
Bronze medal – third place	2024 Linyi
African Championship
Gold medal – first place	2015 Egypt
Silver medal – second place	2017 Egypt

Mohamed Reda (born 28 September 1993) is an Egyptian male volleyball player. He is part of the Egypt men's national volleyball team and won the gold medal at the 2013 Islamic Solidarity Games. On club level he plays for Zamalek SC.

== Sporting achievements ==
=== Clubs ===
- Zamalek SC (Egypt) :
  - 2 × Egyptian Volleyball League :2015/2016,2021/2022.
  - 3 × Egyptian Volleyball Cup : 2016/2017,2020/2021,2021/2022.

=== National team ===
- 2 × Men's African Volleyball Championship : 2013-2015
- 2 × Arab Games : 2014, 2016

=== Individually ===
- Best libero at 2021 Men's African Volleyball Championship
- Best receiver at 2018 African volleyball clubs championship
- Best libero at 2010 African volleyball championship junior team
