= Ahmed Shafik (volleyball) =

Egyptian volleyball player (born 1994)

Personal information
- Nationality: Egyptian
- Born: 7 December 1994 (age 31)
- Height: 190 cm (6 ft 3 in)
- Weight: 97 kg (214 lb)
- Spike: 349 cm (137 in)
- Block: 323 cm (127 in)

Volleyball information
- Position: Outside Hitter
- Current club: (Egypt) Al Ahly SC
- Number: 20 (national team)

Career
Years	Teams
2015-now	(Egypt) Al Ahly SC

National team
2015–	Egypt
Honours
Men's volleyball
Representing Egypt
Gold medal – first place	2015 Egypt
Silver medal – second place	2017 Egypt

Ahmed Shafik (born 7 December 1994) is an Egyptian male volleyball player. He is part of the Egypt men's national volleyball team. On club level he plays for Al Ahly.
