= Egyptian Volleyball Cup =

- Countries: Egypt
- Confederation: Egyptian Volleyball Federation
- Founded: 1976
- Number of teams: 32 (in 2021)
- Domestic championship: Egyptian Championship
- Current winner: Al Ahly SC (2025–26)
- Most titles: Al Ahly SC (24 titles)

The Egyptian Volleyball Cup began with 1976–77 season. It is organized by Egyptian Volleyball Federation. Clubs of all divisions takes part in this competition.

== Titles ==
Season	Winner	Score	Finalist	bronze
1976–77	Al Ahly SC	3 – 0	Sporting	Zamalek SC
1981–82	Al Ahly SC	3 – 1	Gezira SC	
1986–87	Al Ahly SC	3 – 0	Zamalek SC	
1987–88	Al Ahly SC	3 – 0	Zamalek SC	
1988–89	Zamalek SC	3 – 0	Sporting	Al Ahly SC
1989–90	Al Ahly SC	3 – 0	Zamalek SC	
1993–94	Zamalek SC	3 –1	Al Ahly SC	
1995–96	Al Ahly SC	3 – 0	Zamalek SC	
1996–97	Ittihad Alex	3 – 2	El Shams SC	
1998–99	Al Ahly SC	3 – 1	Zamalek SC	
1999–00	Zamalek SC	3 –0	Tersana SC	
2000–01	El Shams SC	3 – 1	Tala'ea El Gaish SC	Zamalek SC
2001–02	Al Ahly SC	3 – 1	Zamalek SC	
2002–03	Al Ahly SC	3 – 0	Zamalek SC	
2003–04	Al Ahly SC	3 – 0	Zamalek SC	
2004–05	Al Ahly SC	3 – 0	Zamalek SC	
2005–06	Al Ahly SC	3 – 1	Zamalek SC	
2006–07	Al Ahly SC	3 – 0	Zamalek SC	
2007–08	Al Ahly SC	round robin	Zamalek SC	
2008-09	Zamalek SC	3 – 2	Al Ahly SC	Tala'ea El Gaish SC
2009–10	Al Ahly SC	3 – 1	Zamalek SC	
2010–11	Al Ahly SC	round robin	Zamalek SC	
2012–13	Al Ahly SC	3 – 2	Zamalek SC	
2013–14	Al Ahly SC	3 – 0	Petrojet SC	
2014–15	Tala'ea El Gaish SC	3 – 1	Zamalek SC	Al Ahly SC
2015–16	Zamalek SC	3 – 1	Tala'ea El Gaish SC	Al Ahly SC
2016–17	Tala'ea El Gaish SC	3 – 0	Zamalek SC	Al Ahly SC
2017–18	Al Ahly SC	3 – 0	Tala'ea El Gaish SC	Zamalek SC
2018–19	Al Ahly SC	3 – 0	Tala'ea El Gaish SC	Sporting
2019–20	Al Ahly SC	3 – 0	Tala'ea El Gaish SC	Zamalek SC
2020–21	Zamalek SC	3 – 2	Al Ahly SC	Tala'ea El Gaish SC
2021–22 (Note: The final was held over 3 legs as a best of 3 series.)	Zamalek SC	3 – 0; 2 – 3; 3 – 1	Al Ahly SC	Tala'ea El Gaish SC

== Performance by club ==
Rk	Club	Cups	Season
1	Al Ahly SC	24	1977, 1982, 1987, 1988, 1990, 1996, 1999, 2002, 2003, 2004, 2005, 2006, 2007, 2008, 2010, 2011, 2013, 2014, 2018, 2019, 2020, 2024, 2025, 2026
2	Zamalek SC	8	1989, 1994, 2000, 2009, 2016, 2021, 2022, 2023
3	Tala'ea El Gaish SC	2	2015, 2017
4	El Shams SC	1	2001
5	Ittihad Alex	1	1997
