= Halim Ebo =

Egyptian volleyball player (born 1989)

Personal information
- Full name: ABD ELHALIM MOHAMED EBOU
- Nickname: Ebo
- Nationality: Egyptian
- Born: 3 June 1989 (age 37); Kafr mahruq, Egypt
- Hometown: Gharbia Governorate
- Height: 2.11 m (6 ft 11 in)
- Weight: 88 kg (194 lb)
- Spike: 360 cm (142 in)
- Block: 345 cm (136 in)

Volleyball information
- Position: Middle Blocker
- Current team: Al Ahly (volleyball)
- Number: 3

Career
Years	Teams
2011-present	Al Ahly SC

National team
2013–Now	Egypt
Honours
Men's volleyball
Representing Egypt
African Championship
Gold medal – first place	2013 Tunisia
Gold medal – first place	2015 Egypt
Silver medal – second place	2017 Egypt
- Last updated: 17 July 2018

Halim Ebo (born 3 June 1989), also known as (Arabic: عبد الحليم عبو), Abd Elhalim Mohamed Abou and Abou Abd Elahim, is an Egyptian indoor volleyball player. With his club Al-Ahly Sporting Club he competed at the 2011 FIVB Volleyball Men's Club World Championship. Since 2013 he is a member of the Egypt men's national volleyball team. He competed at the 2016 Summer Olympics and 2014 World Championships and 2015 FIVB Volleyball Men's World Cup

== Sporting achievements ==
=== Clubs ===
- Al Ahly SC (Egypt) :

- 4 × Egyptian Volleyball League : 2010/11, 2012/13, 2013/14, 2017/18.

- 4 × Egyptian Volleyball Cup : 2010/11, 2012/13, 2013/14, 2017/18.

- 4 × African Clubs Championship (volleyball) : 2015 - 2017 - 2018 - 2022 .

=== National team ===
- 2 × Men's African Volleyball Championship : 2013-2015
- 2 × Arab Games : 2014, 2016

=== Individually ===
- Best server at 2015 Men's African Volleyball Championship
- Best blocker at 2017 African volleyball clubs championship
