= Clubs with the most international titles in volleyball =

Volleyball teams around the world that have won international titles come from all the FIVB-affiliated confederations, such as the Asian Volleyball Confederation (AVC) in Asia and Oceania; Confederación Sudamericana de Voleibol (CSV) in South America; African Volleyball Confederation (CAVB) in Africa; European Volleyball Confederation (CEV) in Europe; and North, Central America and Caribbean Volleyball Confederation (NORCECA) in North America.

Regional titles are not included in this list as these competitions are not recognised by FIVB.

== Top 10 ==
Pos.	Team	Titles	Continental	Trophies
1	(Egypt) Al Ahly SC	24	CAVB	(17) African Clubs Championship (volleyball) + (6) African Volleyball Cup Winners' Cup + (1) Afro-European Volleyball Championship
2	(Soviet Union) CSKA Moscow	16	CEV	(13) CEV Champions League + (3) CEV European Super Cup
3	(Brazil) Sada Cruzeiro	16	CSV	(11) Men's South American Volleyball Club Championship + (5) FIVB Volleyball Men's Club World Championship
4	(Italy) Modena Volley	14	CEV	(4) CEV Champions League + (4) CEV Cup + (5) CEV Challenge Cup + (1) CEV European Super Cup
5	(Italy) Volley Treviso	12	CEV	(4) CEV Champions League + (2) CEV Cup + (4) CEV Challenge Cup + (2) CEV European Super Cup
6	(Italy) Pallavolo Parma	10	CEV	(2) CEV Champions League + (3) CEV Cup + (2) CEV Challenge Cup + (2) CEV European Super Cup + (1) FIVB Volleyball Men's Club World Championship
7	(Italy) Trentino Volley	10	CEV	(4) CEV Champions League + (1) CEV Cup + (5) FIVB Volleyball Men's Club World Championship
8	(Russia) VC Zenit-Kazan	7	CEV	(6) CEV Champions League + (1) FIVB Volleyball Men's Club World Championship
9	(Italy) Cucine Lube Civitanova	7	CEV	(2) CEV Champions League +(4) CEV Challenge Cup + (1) FIVB Volleyball Men's Club World Championship
10	(Italy) Piemonte Volley	7	CEV	(3) CEV Cup +(2) CEV Challenge Cup + (2) CEV European Super Cup

== Countries with most teams in top 10 ==
Pos.	Country	Teams #	Top 3	Top 5	Top 10
1	Italy	6	0	2	6
2	Soviet Union / Russia	2	1	1	2
3	Egypt	1	1	1	1
5	Brazil	1	1	1	1

== Countries with most titles in top 10 ==
Pos.	Country	Titles #
1	Italy	60
3	Egypt	24
2	Soviet Union / Russia	23
4	Brazil	16
