= Mohamed Moawad =

Egyptian volleyball player (born 1987)

Personal information
- Nationality: Egyptian
- Born: 26 August 1987 (age 39)
- Height: 1.94 m (6 ft 4 in)
- Weight: 90 kg (198 lb)
- Spike: 321 cm (126 in)
- Block: 310 cm (122 in)

Volleyball information
- Number: 19

Career
Years	Teams
2014	(Egypt) Al Ahly

National team
2014	Egypt

Mohamed Moawad (born 26 August 1987) is an Egyptian male volleyball player. He was part of the Egypt men's national volleyball team at the 2014 FIVB Volleyball Men's World Championship in Poland. He played for Al Ahly.

== Clubs ==
- Al Ahly (2014)
