= Mohamed Thakil =

Egyptian volleyball player (born 1986)

Personal information
- Nationality: Egyptian
- Born: 12 July 1986 (age 40)
- Height: 1.84 m (6 ft 0 in)
- Weight: 71 kg (157 lb)
- Spike: 326 cm (128 in)
- Block: 315 cm (124 in)

Volleyball information
- Number: 8

Career
Years	Teams
2014	(Egypt) Al Ahly

National team
2014	Egypt

Mohamed Thakil (born 12 July 1986) is an Egyptian male volleyball player. He was part of the Egypt men's national volleyball team at the 2014 FIVB Volleyball Men's World Championship in Poland. He played for Al Ahly.

== Clubs ==
- Al Ahly (2014)
