= Ahmed Kotb =

Egyptian volleyball player (born 1991)

Personal information
- Full name: Ahmed Kotb
- Nationality: Egyptian
- Born: 23 July 1991 (age 35); Egypt
- Height: 2.02 m (6 ft 8 in)
- Weight: 86 kg (190 lb)
- Spike: 328 cm (129 in)
- Block: 318 cm (125 in)

Volleyball information
- Position: Opposite Spiker (2)
- Current team: Al Ahly (volleyball)
- Number: 15

Career
Years	Teams
2008-present	Al Ahly SC

National team
2010–Now	Egypt
Honours
Men's volleyball
Representing Egypt
African Championship
Gold medal – first place	2011 Morocco
Gold medal – first place	2013 Tunisia
Gold medal – first place	2015 Egypt
Silver medal – second place	2017 Egypt
- Last updated: 17 July 2018

Ahmed Kotb (Arabic: احمد قطب) (born 23 July 1991), or Ahmed El-Kotb, is an Egyptian indoor volleyball player. Since 2008 he is a member of the Egypt men's national volleyball team, where he goes by the nickname Kotb. He competed at the 2016 Summer Olympics and 2014 World Championships.

== Sporting achievements ==
=== Clubs ===
- Al Ahly SC (Egypt) :

- 6 × Egyptian Volleyball League : 2008/09, 2009/10, 2010/11, 2012/13, 2013/14, 2017/18.

- 5 × Egyptian Volleyball Cup : 2009/10, 2010/11, 2012/13, 2013/14, 2017/18 .

- 5 × African Clubs Championship (volleyball) : 2010 - 2011 - 2015 - 2017 - 2018 .

- 1 × Arab Clubs Championship (volleyball) : 2010.

=== National team ===
- 3 × Men's African Volleyball Championship : 2011-2013-2015
- 1 × Arab Games : 2016

=== Individually ===
- Top scorer at 2016 Volleyball world League Level 2
- Best Spiker at (2011 African Clubs Championship )
- Best Spiker at (2014 African Clubs Championship )
- MVP at (2015 African Clubs Championship)
- MVP at (2017 African Clubs Championship)
