= Hossam Abdalla =

Egyptian volleyball player (born 1988)

Hossam Youssef Abdallah
Personal information
- Full name: Hossam Youssef Abdallah
- Nationality: Egyptian
- Born: 16 February 1988 (age 38) Damanhur, Egypt
- Home town: Cairo
- Education: Faculty of Pharmacy
- Height: 2.03 m (6 ft 8 in)
- Weight: 97 kg (214 lb)
- Spike: 343 cm (135 in)
- Block: 321 cm (126 in)

Volleyball information
- Position: Setter
- Current club: (Egypt) Al Ahly
- Number: 12

Career
- Years: Team
- 2008-present: (Egypt) Al Ahly

National team
- Years: Team
- 2009-present: Egypt
Honours
Men's volleyball
Representing Egypt
FIVB Challenger Cup
Bronze medal – third place	2024 Linyi
African Championship
Gold medal – first place	2011 Morocco
Gold medal – first place	2013 Tunisia
Gold medal – first place	2015 Egypt
Gold medal – first place	2023 Egypt
Silver medal – second place	2017 Egypt

Hossam Youssef Muhammad Abdallah (born 16 February 1988) is an Egyptian male volleyball player. He was part of the Egypt men's national volleyball team at the 2014 FIVB Volleyball Men's World Championship in Poland. He played for Al Ahly.

== Sporting achievements ==
=== Clubs ===
- Al Ahly SC (Egypt) :

- 10 × Egyptian Volleyball League : 2008/09, 2009/10, 2010/11, 2012/13, 2013/14, 2017/18, 2018/19, 2019/20, 2020/21, 2023/24.

- 9 × Egyptian Volleyball Cup : 2007/2008, 2009/10, 2010/11, 2012/13, 2013/14, 2017/18, 2018/19, 2019/20, 2023/24

- 8 × African Clubs Championship (volleyball) : 2010 - 2011 - 2015 - 2017 - 2018 - 2019 - 2022 - 2024 .

- 3 × Arab Clubs Championship (volleyball) : 2010, 2020, 2023

=== National team ===
- 4 × Men's African Volleyball Championship : 2011-2013-2015-2023
- 1 × Arab Games : 2016
