= Mohamed Masoud (volleyball) =

Egyptian volleyball player (born 1994)

Personal information
- Full name: Mohamed Adel Masoud
- Nickname: Dola
- Nationality: Egyptian
- Born: 1 May 1994 (age 32)
- Height: 211 cm (6 ft 11 in)
- Weight: 105 kg (231 lb)
- Spike: 358 cm (141 in)
- Block: 342 cm (135 in)

Volleyball information
- Position: Middle Blocker
- Current club: (Egypt) Al Ahly SC
- Number: 10 (national team)

Career
- Years: Team
- 2016-now: (Egypt) Al Ahly SC

National team
- Years: Team
- 2015: Egypt
Honours
Men's volleyball
Representing Egypt
FIVB Challenger Cup
Bronze medal – third place	2024 Linyi
African Championship
Gold medal – first place	2015 Egypt
Silver medal – second place	2017 Egypt

Mohamed Masoud (born 1 May 1994) is an Egyptian male volleyball player. He is part of the Egypt men's national volleyball team. On club level he plays for Smouha SC, then in June 2016 he moved to Al Ahly (volleyball)
