= Al Ahly (men's volleyball) =

Egyptian volleyball club

Al Ahly SC (Volleyball)
- Full name: Al Ahly Volleyball Club
- Short name: AHL, ASC
- Nickname: Masters
- Founded: 1932
- Ground: Al Ahly Sports Hall (Capacity: 2500)
- Chairman: (Egypt) Mahmoud El Khatib
- Manager: (United States) Gordon Mayforth
- Captain: (Egypt) Abdallah Abdalsalam
- League: (Egypt) Egyptian Volleyball League
- 2023–24: Champion
- Website: Club home page

Uniforms
Home	Away

Al Ahly Volleyball Club (Arabic: النادي الاهلي للكرة الطائرة), also called "The Masters" (Arabic: الماسترز) is one of Al Ahly SC club's sections that represent the club in Egypt and in international volleyball competitions. The club's volleyball section has been based in Cairo since 1932. It has played in the Egyptian Volleyball League without interruption since 1957. Al Ahly is the most titled club in the Egyptian Volleyball league with 36 titles. Also, the team has participated in African Clubs Championship since 1980 and won the title 17 times.

Al Ahly has participated in FIVB Club World Championship three times in 2010, 2011 and 2015, the team was qualified in 2003 but the FIVB canceled it. Al Ahly is the only Egyptian team that achieved four trophies in the same season, and the only African team that won the Champions League and Winner's Cup in the same season. In 1981 Al Ahly won the Afro-European volleyball championship, held in Netherlands. Al Ahly is the most titled club in the world with international trophies and 24 titles (here), ahead of famous Russian and Italian clubs. Al Ahly also has the world record for the most consecutive wins without defeat at 102 wins in all competitions. The streak ran from April 5th 2017 to 29 January 29th 2020. Suring this period Al-Ahly achieved 6 titles, Al Ahly also had a local and African record by achieving a record of 56 consecutive wins without defeat from 20 November 2009 until 16 December 2010.

== History ==
=== From 1932 to the mid 1950s ===
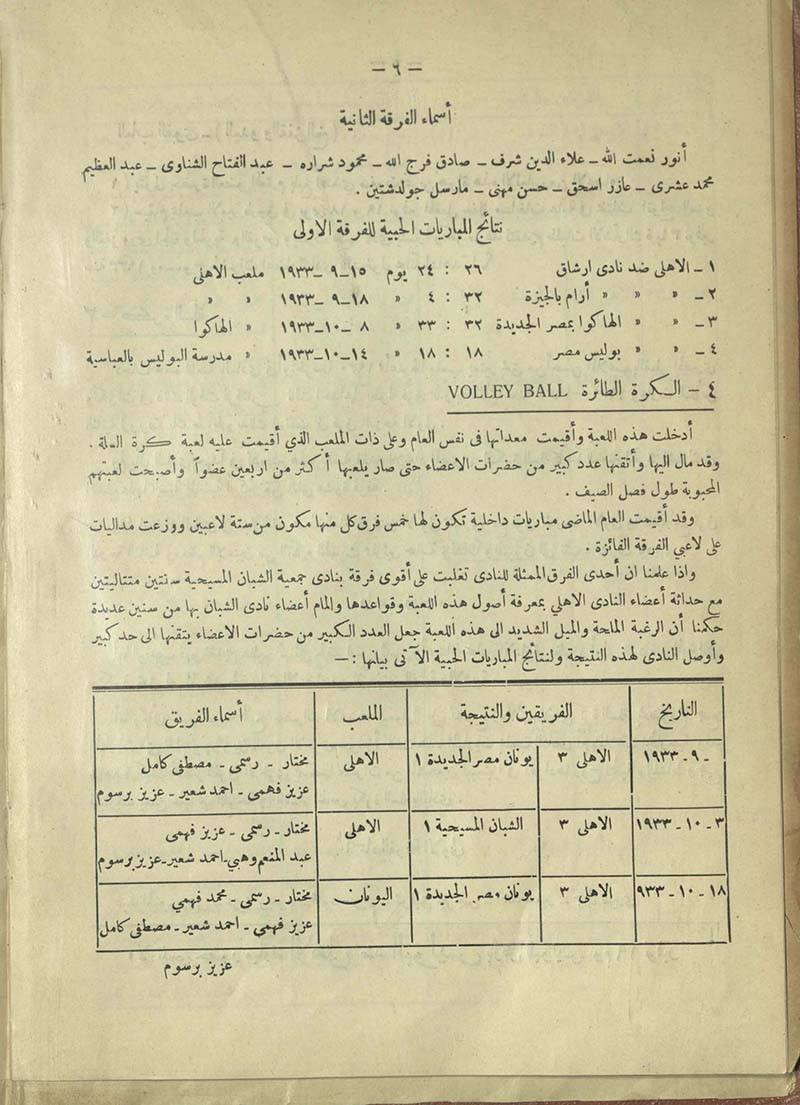
Al Ahly volleyball team first matches

Al Ahly SC volleyball started in 1932. During this time volleyball was not a popular sport and there weren't many volleyball clubs. Al Ahly SC was one of the pioneer clubs in Egypt that helped introduce volleyball into the Egyptian sports community and helped boost its local popularity. Volleyball was introduced into the Egyptian sports field by the foreign communities, specially those from Mediterranean countries, e.g., Italy and Greece. The 1st club in Egypt to play volleyball was the Al Shobban Al Meseheyin club. This was at the inception of the 1920s era. By 1933, roots of volleyball were cemented within Al Ahly. Al Ahly formed its first volleyball team and started to play some friendly games. E.g., a game against Younan (Greek) club on 1 September 1933. The game ended by 3-1 for Al Ahly. The game was held on Al Ahly ground at Al Gazera. Al Ahly formation for this game was as following; Aziz Fahmy, Ahmed Shoeir. Aziz Barsoum, Mostafa Kamel, Rasmy, and Mokhtar. The second friendly game was played against Al Shobban Al Meseheyin on 3 October 1933, ended by 3-1 for Al Ahly, where the squad was formed of; Aziz Fahmy, Ahmed Shoeir, Aziz Barsom, Mostafa Kamel, Rasmy, and Mokhtar. The game played at Al Ahly ground. The 3rd game in the history of Al Ahly volleyball team, was played against Younan (Greek) club on 18 October 1933. It was a friendly away game on Greek club ground. Al Ahly squad for this game was; Aziz Fahmy, Ahmed Shoeir, Aziz Barsom, Mostafa Kamel, Rasmy, Mokhtar, and Mohamed Fahmy. In 1947, the Egyptian volleyball federation (Which at that time was managing and leading all competitions for both sports volleyball and basketball in Egypt), participated in the formation of the Fédération Internationale de Volleyball On 1949, Al Ahly and other 13 clubs contributed in establishing the 1st official committee meeting for the Egyptian volleyball federation who was at that time officially dissociated from the basketball federation, and became a separated independent volleyball federation.

=== From the mid 1950s to the mid 1970s ===
By the middle of the 1950s, the Egyptian volleyball league was established and during this era, Al Ahly was managed by Ayman Sameh. The squad was composed of the following players: Sayed Mostafa (Captain), Samy Al Sebaey, Yousef Mostafa, Zakaria Morgan, Abdel Khalek Wahba, Maged Mandour. 1966–1967 season was a special one for the team, when the club managed to clinch its first Egyptian volleyball league title ever. The squad was full of talented players who managed to cement their names in Al Ahly volleyball history. Some notable players in this eras squad were: Mohamed Fathi El-Rouby, Amr Elwany, Abdel Kahled Wahba, Adly Mostafa, Abdel Rahman Al Wakil, Fouad Abdel Salam, Nabeh Salah, Ayman Ghozlan, Adel Abdel Maksoud, Tawfiek Shehab, Mohamed Al Sharif, Nezar Al Zein, Eid Abdel Malak, The team was managed by Sayed Mostafa (Ex-team captain), and the coach was Abdel Latif Ibrahim.

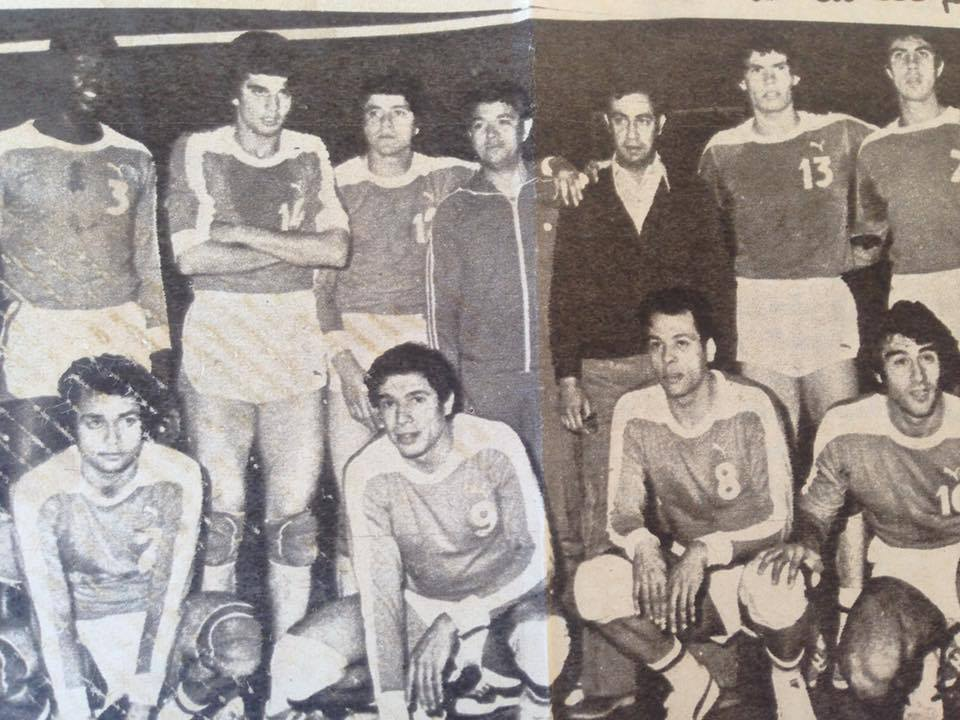
Al Ahly volleyball senior team in 1970s

=== From the mid 1970s to the mid 1980s ===
This was one of the most shining parts in Al Ahly volleyball history. The team managed to dominate all competitions. At this era, Al Ahly managed to clinch 9 titles of the Egyptian volleyball league (won 9 out of 10 played). Also, managed to win two Egyptian Volleyball cups. The team also won the African champions league twice; 1980 and 1983. Both of those African titles were after beating the rival Zamalek in the final. On 1981, Al Ahly managed to win Afro-European cup that was held in Netherlands by participation of Champions clubs from France and Netherland. It was a great milestone for Al Ahly volleyball to move its excellence to global level; Europe, not only locally and continentally. During this era; the squad formation was: Nour Attia, Mahmoud Farag, Ibrahim Fakhr Eldin, Ring Lual (Sudanese player), Ihab Fakhr Eldin, Ahmed Zakaria, Shaaban Khalifa, Mohamed Shaarawy, Gomaa Abdel Hamid, Tarik Farid, Mamdouh Ismail, Wagih Hamdy, Ayman Fakhr Eldin, Reda El Ghazali, Ahmed Al Shamoty, Khaled Al Shamoty. Tawfik Shehab and Ihab Fakhr Eldin coach the team in this era.

=== The mid 1980s to the end of the 20th century ===
This was a reeling era for Al Ahly. This was because of retirement of the best players, in addition to some other administrative issues during the presidency term of Abdo Saleh Al Wahsh (1988-1992). There was a major conflict between the team players and the club administration, led to departure for the most main and reserve players. However, during this era, and until 1993, Al Ahly won 3 Egyptian volleyball league titles, and 3 Egyptian volleyball cups, one Arab Volleyball cup in 1987, two African titles in 1990 (which was held in Egypt on Zamalek SC ground), and in 1991 in Algeria. Both of those African titles were clinched after beating the rival Zamalek in the finals. But by 1994, Al Ahly managed to return to conquer the volleyball fields not only in Egypt, but in Africa as well. Al Ahly won the Egyptian Volleyball league 3 consecutive times, 3 consecutive African league cup, and 3 African cup clubs as well. No African team managed to do such achievement to date like Al Ahly has already made in the 1990s.

1995-96 was astonishing season for Al Ahly. The team managed to win 4 titles in one season for the first time: Egyptian league, Egyptian Cup, African league, African cup. Also, the silver medal for the Arab cup after being beaten in the final against Al Hilal (Saudi Arabia). Al Ahly finished the 20th century adding new two Egyptian league titles, two Egyptian cups, and African title after beating Zamalek in Ethiopia in 2000 in the final as usual. In total, between 1995: 2000, Al Ahly won 5 leagues, 2 cups, 3 African league, 4 African cup. Tally of 14 titles. It worth mentioning that during this period, the Egyptian cup was cancelled several times regarding the national team commitment with some official tournaments. The most notable players during this era were: Emad Farouk, Hisham Abdel Razik, Maged Mostafa, Khaled Abbas, Hany Moselhy, Hamdy El Safy, Mohamed Moselhy, Mohamed Abdel Karim, Mohamoud Gomaa, Sameh Ali Kamel, Ayman Roshdy, Hisham Salah, Yasin Amin, Mohamed Abdel Rahman, Wael El Aydi.

=== From 2001: Current ===
This era started with little bit fluctuating. Al Ahly lost the local league for the first time after years, withdrawn twice from the cup as it was played without the international players; while there was 7 players and the team coach involved in the national team at that time. Al Ahly lost the African league title as well in 2001 in Cairo against Etoile Sahel Tunisia. But quickly, Al Ahly managed to return to seize the volleyball competitions in Egypt, Africa, and the middle east. Al Ahly won the league 3 times, the cup 3 times, and two consecutive Arab cup titles, and two consecutive African titles after beating the Tunisian team Qulaybi in the final, both times in Egypt and Algeria. In 2002–03 season, Al Ahly won 4 titles again after clinching the league, cup, Arab cup, and African league. By 2005–06, Al Ahly repeated the same brilliant performance by winning the same 4 titles in one season.

This was so evident, how was Al Ahly so strong in this era. By end of 2005–06 season, the player maker Abdalla Abdel Salam left the club to join the Italian side Treviso. This contributed later in losing the league in 2008, and the cup in 2009, two African finals, and one Arab cup final as well by 2009.

Al Ahly, the club of century for Volleyball in Egypt and Africa, quickly progressed and by season 2009-10 managed to make a historic season by winning 4 titles again in one season: League, Cup, Arab cup, and African league. In this season, the team played 54 games, won 53 times, and only losing one game in the preliminary local league stage. So, Al Ahly won 4 volleyball titles in the same season 4 times: 1995–96, 2002–03, 2005–06, and 2009–10. The only Egyptian and African team to attain such amazing record. After the end of the last-mentioned season, Hamdi El Safy retired, Abdallah Abdel Salam and Ahmed Salah transferred to Europe, Wael El Aydi moved to the rival Zamalek. All of those factors led to give the opportunity for new and youth players such as: Ahmed Kotb, Hossam Youssef, Abdel Halim Ebo, Ahmed Abdel Aal, Mohamed Moawad, Ahmed Saied. Between 2015 and 2017, because of dispute with the club sports administration, some of the team players left the club and moved to Army SC. Army SC at that time looked to be like Al Ahly second team (Al Ahly B), and for 3 years, they managed to win 2 leagues, 2 cups, and 1 African title in 2016. Those players were; Ahmed Salah, Abdallah Abdel Salam, Mohamed Al Hosseiny, Omar Naguib, Mamdouh Abdel Karim, Mahmoud Raouf, Mahmoud El Komy. Al Ahly failed to win the league for three times in row. The same for the Egyptian cup. However, Al Ahly won the African titles twice during this period, in 2015 and 2017 in Tunisia. By 2017–18 season, Al Ahly back to the good performance and managed to win three titles in one season: League, Cup, African titles. This was without losing any game during the whole season. Tally of Al Ahly titles during this era, from 2002 to 2018 was 11 league titles, 12 Egyptian cup, 8 African titles, and 4 Arab cups. This was enough to consider this era as the best across Al Ahly volleyball history. Al Ahly also during this era has participated in the World cup clubs three times; 2010, 2011 and 2015. The most notable players in this era (2000 to 2010) were : Ahmed Salah, Abdallah Abdel Salam, Mohamed El Sayed, Hamdy El Safy, Mohamed Moselhy, Osama Komsan, Hossam Shaarway, Maged Mostafa, Mohamed Abdel Rahman, Wael ElAydi, Mahmoud Raouf. (2010: Current) Ahmed Kotb, Hossam Youssef, Abdel Halim Ebo, Ahmed Abdel Aal, Ahmed Saied, Mohamed Adel Dola, Mohamed Moawad.

== Most consecutive volleyball victories in all competitions ==
Beside the total domination of Al Ahly over Africa and being the most crowned club with international trophies all over the world Al Ahly also own the most winning streak known on the volleyball history Al Ahly is having a 102 win on the row recording a no lose streak for the last 3 years until 29 January 2020 This chain has started on 5 April 2017, During this unbelievable record Al Ahly has been titled with the Egyptian League 2 times, Egyptian Cup 2 times and African Club Championship 2 times During this chain also Al Ahly has won 18 successive matches with the result 3–0 without losing any set The total sets won during this streak are 303 sets while losing only 20 The 102 wins details were as follow 83 matches has ended as 3–0, 16 matches with 3–1 and only 2 matches finished with the result 3–2.

36 different teams have been beaten by Al Ahly during this streak, Aviation club is having the most losses by 9 games Mohamed Moselhy the ex. Al Ahly player was the coach of the team during the whole streak by leading a total of 37 players whom participated during the whole three years and 101 matches.

== Honours ==
=== National achievements ===
- Egyptian Volleyball League :

Winners 36 titles (Record) : 1965–66, 1966–67, 1967–68, 1975–76, 1976–77, 1977–78, 1979–80, 1980–81, 1981–82, 1982–83, 1983–84, 1984–85, 1986–87, 1989–90, 1993–94, 1994–95, 1995–96, 1998–99, 1999–00, 2001–02, 2002–03, 2003–04, 2005–06, 2006–07, 2008–09, 2009–10, 2010–11, 2012–13, 2013–14, 2017–18, 2018–19, 2019–20, 2020–21, 2023–24, 2024–25, 2025–26.

- Egyptian Volleyball Cup :

Winners 24 titles (Record) : 1976–77, 1981–82, 1986–87, 1987–88, 1989–90, 1995–96, 1998–99. 2001–02, 2002–03, 2003–04, 2004–05, 2005–06, 2006–07, 2007–08, 2009–10, 2010–11, 2012–13, 2013–14, 2017–18, 2018–19, 2019–20, 2023–24, 2024–25, 2025–26.

- Egyptian Mortabat League :

Winners 1 titles (Record) : 2025–26

- Egypt Volleyball Super Cup :

Winners 4 titles (Record) : 2023, 2024, 2025, 2026.

=== International Achievements ===
- African Club Championship :

Winners 17 titles (Record) : 1980, 1983, 1995, 1996, 1997, 2003, 2004, 2006, 2010, 2011, 2015, 2017, 2018, 2019, 2022, 2024, 2026

Runners-Up : 1984, 1987, 2008, 2009, 2014

- African Volleyball Cup Winners' Cup :

Winners 6 titles (Record) : 1990, 1991, 1995, 1996, 1997, 2000

Runners-Up : 2001

- Afro-European Volleyball Championship :

Winners 1 title : 1981

=== Regional Achievements ===
- Arab Clubs Championship (volleyball) :

Winners 8 titles (Record) : 1987, 2001, 2002, 2005, 2006, 2010, 2020, 2023

Runners-Up : 1996, 2009, 2025

=== Worldwide Competitions ===
- FIVB Volleyball Men's Club World Championship :

Fifth-Place (4) : 2010, 2011, 2015, 2024

== Records ==
The times Al Ahly have won more than one trophy during one season :

Record	Number	Seasons
Quadruple (note)	5	1995–96, 2005–06, 2009–10, 2023–24, 2025–26.
Treble (note)	11	1986–87, 1989–90, 1994–95, 2001–02, 2002–03, 2003–04, 2010–11, 2017–18, 2018–19, 2019–20, 2024–25.
Double (note)	11	1976–77, 1980–81, 1981–82, 1982–83, 1996–97, 1998–99, 1999–00, 2006–07, 2012–13, 2013–14, 2022–23.

== Current squad ==
Team roster — season 2020–2021
Al Ahly Volleyball Team
Num	Name	Date of Birth	Position	Height	Weight
4	(Egypt) Ahmed Salah (V)	19/08/1984	opposite Spiker	197 Cm	87 kg
15	(Egypt) Ahmed Kotb	23/07/1991	opposite Spiker	202 Cm	86 kg
12	(Egypt) Hossam Youssef	16/02/1988	Setter	203 Cm	97 kg
2	(Egypt) Abdallah Abdalsalam (C)	10/10/1986	Setter	198 Cm	85 kg
#	(Egypt) Youssef Morgan	13/04/1999	Setter	184 Cm	86 kg
3	(Egypt) Abd Elhalim Ebo	03/06/1989	Middle Blocker	211 Cm	88 kg
5	(Egypt) Abdelrahman Seoudy	21/08/1997	Middle Blocker	206 cm	100 kg
16	(Egypt) Mohamed Abdelmohsen	04/01/1995	Middle Blocker	208 Cm	90 kg
10	(Egypt) Mohamed Adel Masoud	01/05/1994	Middle Blocker	211 Cm	105 kg
#	(Italy) Luigi Randazzo	30/04/1994	Outside Hitter	200 Cm	97 kg
11	(Egypt) Abdelrahman Hossiney	24/08/2001	Outside Hitter	186 Cm	78 kg
11	(Egypt) Ahmed Azab Abdelrahman	01/03/2000	Outside Hitter	200 Cm	94 kg
18	(Egypt) Ahmed Said Shafik	07/12/1994	Outside Hitter	190 Cm	97 kg
7	(Egypt) Mohamed Assran	30/12/1995	Outside Hitter	195 Cm	90 kg
9	(Cuba) Yonder García	26/02/1993	Libro	183 Cm	78 kg
17	(Egypt) Mohamed Ramadan	01/07/1995	Libro	185 Cm	76 kg

== Depth chart ==
Pos.	Starting	Bench 1	Bench 2
Opposite; Spiker	(Egypt) Ahmed Salah	(Egypt) Ahmed Kotb	
Outside hitter	(Egypt) Ahmed Said Shafik	(Egypt) Mohamed Assran	
Outside hitter	(Italy) Luigi Randazzo	(Egypt) Abdelrahman Hossiney	(Egypt) Ahmed Azab Abdelrahman
Middle Blocker	(Egypt) Abd Elhalim Ebo	(Egypt) Mohamed Adel Masoud	(Egypt) Mohamed Abdelmohsen
Setter	(Egypt) Abdallah Abdalsalam	(Egypt) Hossam Youssef Abdallah	
Libero	(Cuba) Yonder García	(Egypt) Mohamed Ramadan	

== Transfers ==
- Transfers for the 2022–23 season

Joining

- (Italy) Luigi Randazzo from (Italy) Prisma Volley
- (Cuba) Yonder García from (Cuba) Ciudad Habana
- (Egypt) Ahmed Azzab (Egypt) from Petrojet SC

Leaving

- (Egypt) Mohamed Moawad to Retire
- (Egypt) Ahmed Abdelaal to ??

Transfers for the 2021-22 season

Joining

- (United States) Garrett Muagututia from (Poland) Warta Zawiercie
- (Brazil) Maurício Borges from (Italy) Volley Callipo
- (Egypt) Mohamed Mohsen (Egypt) Zamalek SC
- (Egypt) Ahmed Assran (Egypt) (Tala'ea El-Gaish SC)
- (Egypt) Youssif Morgan back from loan

Leaving

- (Egypt) Yousef Elsafi to (France) Stade Poitevin Poitiers
- (Bulgaria) Krasimir Georgiev to (France) AS Cannes Volley-Ball
- (Egypt) Mahmoud Raouf retire
- (Canada) Raymond Szeto to ??
- (Egypt) Abd latif Osamn to ??
- (Egypt) Abou Elsouad Emam to Smouha SC

Transfers for the 2020-21 season

Joining

- (Canada) Raymond Szeto from (Bahrain) Al-Ahli Club (Manama)
- (Bulgaria) Krasimir Georgiev from (Romania) CS Arcada Galați

Leaving

- (Egypt) Mohamed Abdelmonaem to Zamalek SC
- (Canada) Jason DeRocco to ??
- (Egypt) Youssef Elsafi to Petrojet loan
- (Egypt) Youssif Morgan to Petrojet loan
- (Egypt) Omar Akram to (Tala'ea El-Gaish SC) loan
- (Egypt) Omar Zakaria to Petrojet loan
- (Egypt) Omar Yasso to (Germany) SV Lindow-Gransee

Transfers for the 2019-20 season

Joining

- (Egypt) Abouelsouad Emam from Zamalek SC (volleyball)
- (Canada) Jason DeRocco from (Japan) FC Tokyo (volleyball)

Leaving

- (Russia) Sergey Burtsev to (Russia) FC Yugra Nizhnevartovsk
- (Egypt) Sherief Ahmed to Petrojet loan

Transfers for the 2018-19 season

Joining

- (Egypt) Ahmed Salah from (Tala'ea El-Gaish SC)
- (Egypt) Mahmoud Raouf from (Tala'ea El-Gaish SC)
- (Russia) Sergey Burtsev from (Romania) CSM BUCURESTI

Leaving

- (Tunisia) Chokri Jouini to (Esperance)
- (Egypt) Karim farag to ??
- (Egypt) Ahmed Hamada to (Tala'ea El-Gaish SC) loan
- (Egypt) Marawan shawkey to Aviation SC loan

Transfers for the 2017–18 season

Joining

- (Egypt) Abdallah Abdalsalam (Tala'ea El-Gaish SC)
- (Tunisia) Chokri Jouini (Esperance)
- (Egypt) Marawan Mohamed (back from loan)

Leaving

- (Ukraine) Ruslav Sheshstov
- (Egypt) ahmed el laqani
- (Egypt) ahmed baka

Transfers for the 2016–17 season

Joining

- (Egypt) Badawy Mohamed Moneim Zamalek SC (volleyball)
- (Egypt) Mohamed Adel Smouha SC
- (Egypt) Abdellatif Ahmed Zamalek SC (volleyball)
- (Egypt) Karim Farg heliopolis SC
- (Ukraine) Ruslan Shevtsov Free Transfer

Leaving

- (Algeria) Mohamed Amine Oumessad
- (Brazil) Bruno Zanuto
- (Egypt) Mohamed Kamel
- (Egypt) Mohamed El Mahdy
- (Egypt) Mohamed Ketat (loan)
- (Egypt) Marawan Mohamed (loan)

== Technical and managerial staff ==
Name	Role	Nationality
Gordon Mayforth	Head coach	American
Tamer Magdey	Coach	Egyptian
Mahmoud Gomaa	Assistant coach	Egyptian
Mohammed Zakryia	Technical analyst	Egyptian
Khaled Abu Zeina	Team Manager	Egyptian
Ayman Ali	Assistant Team manager	Egyptian
Ehab Fakr Eldeen	Physiotherapist	Egyptian
Haitham Eldabaa	Physiotherapist	Egyptian
Abd ELRahman Mekki	Masseur	Egyptian

== The Most titled clubs with International Trophies ==
Pos.	Team	Titles	Continental	Trophies
1	(Egypt) Al Ahly SC	24	CAVB	(17) African Clubs Championship (volleyball) + (6) African Volleyball Cup Winners' Cup + (1) Afro -European Volleyball Championship
2	(Soviet Union) CSKA Moscow	16	CEV	(13) CEV Champions League + (3) CEV European Super Cup
3	(Brazil) Sada Cruziero	16	CSV	(11) Men's South American Volleyball Club Championship + (5) FIVB Volleyball Men's Club World Championship
4	(Italy) Modena Volley	14	CEV	(4) CEV Champions League + (4) CEV Cup + (5) CEV Challenge Cup + (1) CEV European Super Cup
5	(Italy) Volley Treviso	12	CEV	(4) CEV Champions League + (2) CEV Cup + (4) CEV Challenge Cup + (2) CEV European Super Cup
6	(Italy) Pallavolo Parma	10	CEV	(2) CEV Champions League + (3) CEV Cup + (2) CEV Challenge Cup + (2) CEV European Super Cup + (1) FIVB Volleyball Men's Club World Championship
7	(Italy) Trentino Volley	10	CEV	(4) CEV Champions League + (1) CEV Cup + (5) FIVB Volleyball Men's Club World Championship
8	(Russia) VC Zenit-Kazan	7	CEV	(6) CEV Champions League + (1) FIVB Volleyball Men's Club World Championship
9	(Italy) Cucine Lube Civitanova	7	CEV	(2) CEV Champions League +(4) CEV Challenge Cup + (1) FIVB Volleyball Men's Club World Championship
10	(Italy) Piemonte Volley	7	CEV	(3) CEV Cup +(2) CEV Challenge Cup + (2) CEV European Super Cup

== Men's African Competition Records ==
Men's African Club Competitions
Year	African Clubs Championship	African Cup Winners' Cup
1980	Champion	started in 1989
1982	Did not hold	started in 1989
1983	Champion	started in 1989
1984	Runner-Up	started in 1989
1985	Did not enter	started in 1989
1986	Did not enter	started in 1989
1987	Runner-Up	started in 1989
1988	Semi-finals	started in 1989
1989	Quarter-finals	Semi-finals
1990	Did not enter	Champion
1991	Did not enter	Champion
1992	Did not enter	Did not enter
1993	Semi-finals	Did not enter
1994	Did not enter	Did not enter
1995	Champion	Champion
1996	Champion	Champion
1997	Champion	Champion
1998	Did not enter	Did not hold
1999	Semi-finals	Did not hold
2000	Did not enter	Champion
2001	Did not enter	Runner-Up
2002	Did not enter	Did not enter
2003	Champion	Did not enter
2004	Champion	Did not enter
2005	Did not enter	Did not hold
2006	Champion	Did not enter
2007	Semi-finals	Canceled
2008	Runner-Up	Canceled
2009	Runner-Up	Canceled
2010	Champion	Canceled
2011	Champion	Canceled
2012	Semi-finals	Canceled
2013	Did not enter	Canceled
2014	Runner-Up	Canceled
2015	Champion	Canceled
2016	Quarter-finals	Canceled
2017	Champion	Canceled
2018	Champion	Canceled
2019	Champion	Canceled
2020	Canceled due to COVID-19 pandemic	Canceled
2021	Did not enter	Canceled
2022	Champion	Canceled
2023	Did not enter	
2024	Champion	
2025	Semi-finals	
2026	Champion	

== Men's Arab Competition Records ==
Year	Arab Clubs Championship
1978	Did not enter
1979	Did not hold
1980	Did not hold
1981	Did not hold
1982	Did not hold
1983	Did not enter
1984	Did not enter
1985	Did not enter
1986	Did not enter
1987	Champion
1988	Did not hold
1989	Did not enter
1990	Did not hold
1991	Did not hold
1992	Did not enter
1993	Did not enter
1994	Did not enter
1995	Did not enter
1996	Runner-Up
1997	Did not enter
1998	Did not enter
1999	Did not enter
2000	Did not enter
2001	Champion
2002	Champion
2003	Did not enter
2004	Did not hold
2005	Champion
2006	Champion
2007	Did not enter
2008	Did not enter
2009	Runner-Up
2010	Champion
2011	Did not enter
2012	Did not enter
2013	withdraw from semifinals
2014	Did not enter
2015	Did not enter
2016	Did not enter
2017	Did not enter
2018	Did not enter
2019	Did not enter
2020	Champion
2021	Canceled due to COVID-19 pandemic
2022	Did not enter
2023	Champion
2024	Did not enter
2025	Runner-Up

== 2017–2018 The trilogy Season ==
=== The road to Egy league trophy ===
≥ Final Round matches

Round	Team	Home	Away
1 & 8	(Egypt) Aviation SC	3–0	3–0
2 & 9	(Egypt) Sporting	3–0	3-1
3 & 10	(Egypt) 6th October club	3–0	3-1
4 & 11	(Egypt) Ittihad Alex	3–0	3–0
5 & 12	(Egypt) Zamalek SC	3–2	3-1
6 & 13	(Egypt) Smouha SC	3–0	3–0
7 & 14	(Egypt) Tala'ea El Gaish SC	3–0	3–0

≥ Final League Ranking

RNK	Team	PLD	W-L	Sets(W-L)	pts
1st	(Egypt) Al Ahly	14	14–0	42–5	41
2nd	(Egypt) Zamalek SC	14	11–3	37–13	33
3rd	(Egypt) El Gaish	14	10–4	31–13	30
4th	(Egypt) Aviation SC	14	8–6	24–25	23
5th	(Egypt) Smouha SC	14	7–7	26–26	22
6th	(Egypt) Sporting	14	4-10	18–32	13
7th	(Egypt) Ittihad Alex	14	2–12	9–37	6
8th	(Egypt) 6th October	14	0–14	6–42	0

=== The road to The African Title ===
#	Round	Team	Home
1	Group Stage (Group A)	(Uganda) Nimo Star	3–0
2	Group Stage (Group A)	(Ivory Coast) AS POLICE	3–0
3	Group Stage (Group A)	(Kenya) Prisons SC	3–0
4	Group Stage (Group A)	(Lesotho) Red Skin	3–0
5	Group Stage (Group A)	(Democratic Republic of the Congo) VC Espoir	3–0
6	Quarter Final	(Kenya) GSU	3–1
7	Semifinal	(Egypt) Smouha SC	3–0
8	Final	(Egypt) El Gaish	3–0

=== The road to Egy Cup Title ===
#	Round	Team	Home
1	Round of 32	(Egypt) Alhiwar	3–0
2	Round of 16	(Egypt) Shams SC	3–0
3	Quarter-finals	(Egypt) Damanhur	3–0
4	Semifinal	(Egypt) Zamalek SC	3–0
5	Final	(Egypt) El Gaish	3–0

== Derby Record ==
Al Ahly VB Vs. Zamalek VB is the derby of Egyptian volleyball competitions, in 2009–2010 the derby competition set a special record: Al Ahly VB won 6 times in same season during 4 consecutive months without any losses against Zamalek VB.

Num	Date	Result	Sets	Competition
1	1 Jan 2010	3–2	(25–18), (23–25), (23–25), (30–28), (16–14)	Egyptian League (Regular Season)
2	5th Fab 2010	3-1	(28–26), (23–25), (25–20), (25–23)	Egyptian League (Regular Season)
3	24 March 2010	3-1	(25–20), (20–25), (31–29), (25–22)	Egyptian League (Playoffs)
4	1 April 2010	3-1	(25–27), (25–20), (25–18), (25–22)	Egyptian Cup Final
5	12 April 2010	3-1	(22–25), (38–36), (25–19), (25–21)	Egyptian League (Playoffs)
6	29 April 2010	3-1	(25–20), (21–25), (25–16), (25–15)	African Championship Final

== Head coaches ==
This is a list of the senior team's head coaches in the recent years :

Dates	Name
→ 2025–	(United States) Gordon Mayforth
→ 2023–2025	(Spain) Fernando Muñoz Benítez
→ 2016–2023	(Egypt) Mohamed Meselhy
→ 2015–2016	(Egypt) Ahmed Zakarya
→ 2009–2015	(Egypt) Ibrahim Fakhr Eldeen
→ 2005–2009	(Egypt) Noor Atia
→ 2001–2004	(Egypt) Foaud Abd Elsalam
→ 1995–2001	(Egypt) Ibrahim Fakhr Eldeen
→ 1993–1995	(Egypt) Tawfik Shehab
→ 1985–1993	(Egypt) Foaud Abd Elsalam
→ 1984–1985	(Egypt) Hesham Badrawey
→ 1981–1984	(Egypt) Ibrahim Fakhr Eldeen
→ 1980–1981	(Egypt) Tawfik Shehab
→ N/A	(Egypt) Ali Refaay
→ N/A	(Egypt) Tawfik Shehab
→ N/A	(Egypt) Waheed Hendawy
→ N/A	(Egypt) Abd Ellatif ibrahim

== Kit manufacturers and shirt sponsors ==
Period	Kit supplier	Shirt sponsors
2006–2009	(Germany) Puma	(United Kingdom) Vodafone / (Egypt) Juhayna / (United States) Chevrolet / (United States) Coca-Cola
2009–2011	(Germany) Adidas	(United Kingdom) Vodafone / (Egypt) Juhayna / (United States) Chevrolet / (United States) Coca-Cola
2011–2015	(Germany) Adidas	(United Arab Emirates) Etisalat / (Egypt) Juhayna / (United States) Chevrolet
2015–2017	(Italy) Diadora	(United Kingdom) Vodafone / (Egypt) Juhayna / (China) Huawei / (Egypt) Egyptian Steel / (United Kingdom) Shell Helix / (United States) Domino's
2017–2018	(Germany) Hummel	(United Kingdom) Vodafone / (Egypt) Juhayna / (China) Huawei / (Egypt) Egyptian Steel / (United Kingdom) Shell Helix / (United States) Domino's
2018–2019	(Germany) Hummel	(Egypt) TORNADO / (India) LAVA / (United Kingdom) Vodafone
2019–2020	(Spain) Kelme	(Egypt) WE / (Egypt) TIGER / (Egypt) GLC Paints / (United Kingdom) Shell Helix
2024–2025	(Germany) Jako	e& Egypt / FABMISR Bank / (United Kingdom) Shell Helix / GLC Paints / Al Marasem / (United Kingdom) Lipton

== Home arena ==
When Al Ahly began to create the teams of Handball, Basketball, and Volleyball, they saw the importance to build an arena to host the home matches of these teams. They first began to make the designs and search for funds in 1978, but due to some funding problems, the project was postponed. Later, on 4 February 1994, Al Ahly opened its sports hall officially under Al Ahly Chairman Saleh Selim.

Opening Ceremony After many years of waiting Al Ahly finally achieved the dream and built its sports hall arena, on 4 February 1994 Al Ahly officially opened its hall in a big opening ceremony. The ceremony began with opening words from Al Ahly Chairman at that time Saleh Selim and declared that the name of the hall would be "Prince Abdullah Al-Faisal Hall" to his contributions to Al Ahly. His son Mohammed El Faisal received a commemorative medal.

The first game held on Al Ahly sports hall was a basketball game between Al Ahly and Ithhadd Alex, after that they played a Futsal match between Al Ahly old players against El Esmailly old players. Mahmoud El Khatib and Aly Abu Greisha participated at that match.

== Notable players ==
- 01- (Egypt) Ahmed Salah
- 02- (Egypt) Abdallah Abdel Salam
- 03- (Egypt) Hamdy El Safi
- 04- (Egypt) Mohamed Moselhey
- 05- (Egypt) Hany Moselhey
- 06- (Egypt) Emad Farouk
- 07- (Egypt) Mamdouh Ismail
- 08- (Egypt) Fouad Abdel salam
- 09- (Egypt) Amr Elwani
- 10- (Egypt) Fikry Elzanaty
- 11- (Egypt) Ahmed Elshmooty
- 12- (Egypt) Ibrahim Fakr Eldeen
- 13- (Egypt) Ayman Roshdy
- 14- (Egypt) Maged Mostafa
- 15- (Egypt) Mahmoud Farag
- 16- (Egypt) Raouf Abdelkader
- 17- (Egypt) Nour Attia
- 18- (Egypt) Twafik Shehab
- 19- (South Sudan) Ring Lewal
- 20- (Egypt) Ahmed Zakaria
- 21- (Egypt) Ossama Komsan
- 22- (Egypt) Mohamed Abdelrahman
- 23- (Egypt) Wael Al Aidy
- 24- (Egypt) Mahmoud Shaarawy
- 25- (Egypt) Gaber Abdel Salam
- 26- (Australia) Shan Alexander
- 27- (Egypt) Ehab Fakr Eldeen
- 28- (Egypt) Nabih Salah
- 29- (Egypt) Yasser Salah
- 30- (Egypt) Khaled Elshmooty
- 31- (Egypt) Medhat Kamal
- 32- (Egypt) Yassin Amin

== Club Presidents ==
No	Period	Name	From	To
1	1st	(England) Mitchel Ince	1907	1908
2	1st	(Egypt) Aziz Ezzat Pacha	1908	1916
3	1st	(Egypt) Abdelkhaleq Tharwat Pacha	1916	1924
4	1st	(Egypt) Gaafar Waly Pacha	1924	1940
5	1st	(Egypt) Mohamed Taher Pacha	1940	1941
6	2nd	(Egypt) Gaafar Waly Pacha	1941	1944
7	1st	(Egypt) Ahmed Hasanein Pacha	1944	1946
8	1st	(Egypt) Ahmed Aboud Pacha	1946	1961
9	1st	(Egypt) Salah Desouky Sheshtawy	1961	1965
10	1st	(Egypt) Abdelmohsen Kamel Mortagy	1965	1967
11	1st	(Egypt) Ibrahim El Wakil	1967	1972
12	2nd	(Egypt) Abdelmohsen Kamel Mortagy	1972	1980
13	1st	(Egypt) Saleh Selim	1980	1988
14	1st	(Egypt) Mohamed Abdou Saleh El Wahsh	1988	1992
15	2nd	(Egypt) Saleh Selim	1992	2002
16	1st	(Egypt) Hassan Hamdy	2002	2014
17	1st	(Egypt) Mahmoud Taher	2014	2017
18	1st	(Egypt) Mahmoud El Khatib	2017	Present

== See also ==
- Al Ahly FC
- Al Ahly FC Women
- Al Ahly (volleyball)
- Al Ahly Women's Volleyball
- Al Ahly (basketball)
- Al Ahly Women's Basketball
- Al Ahly (handball)
- Al Ahly Women's Handball
- Al Ahly (table tennis)
- Al Ahly (water polo)
- Port Said Stadium riot
- Al-Ahly TV
