= Mamdouh Abdelrehim =

Egyptian volleyball player (born 1989)

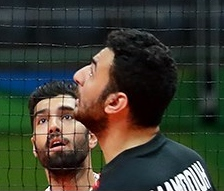
- Abdelrehim (right) at the 2016 Olympics

Personal information
- Nationality: Egyptian
- Born: 5 August 1989 (age 37); Cairo, Egypt
- Height: 2.07 m (6 ft 9 in)
- Weight: 90 kg (198 lb)
- Spike: 338 cm (133 in)
- Block: 325 cm (128 in)

Volleyball information
- Position: Middle blocker
- Current club: Tala'ea El-Gaish SC
- Number: 6

Career
Years	Teams
2014	(Egypt) Al Ahly

National team
2014	Egypt

Mamdouh Abdulmonaim Muhammad Abdelrehim (born 5 August 1989) is an Egyptian volleyball player. He was part of the Egypt men's national volleyball team at the 2014 FIVB Volleyball Men's World Championship and 2016 Summer Olympics.

== Clubs ==
Abdelrehim is affiliated with Tala'ea El-Gaish SC, a club based in Cairo, which showcases his active engagement in the sport beyond just international competitions
