= Ahmed Afifi (volleyball) =

Egyptian volleyball player (born 1988)

Personal information
- Nationality: Egypt
- Born: 30 March 1988 (age 36); Giza, Egypt
- Height: 1.94 m (6 ft 4 in)
- Weight: 92 kg (203 lb)

Sport
- Sport: Volleyball

Ahmed Afifi (born 30 March 1988) is an Egyptian volleyball player. He competed in the 2016 Summer Olympics.
