= Egyptian Volleyball Federation =

Governing body of volleyball in Egypt

- Sport: Volleyball; Beach volleyball
- Jurisdiction: Egypt
- Abbreviation: EVBF
- Affiliation: FIVB
- Affiliation date: 1992
- Headquarters: Nasr City, Cairo
- President: YASSER KAMAR

Official website
- www.egyvb.org
- (Egypt)

The Egyptian Volleyball Federation is the governing body for volleyball in Egypt and is responsible for the administration of the Egyptian national volleyball teams (both men's and women's). Its offices are located in Nasr City, Cairo.

== See also ==
- Egypt men's national volleyball team
- Egypt women's national volleyball team
