= Tala'ea El Gaish SC =

Association football club in Cairo, Egypt

Tala'ea el-Gaish
- Full name: Tala'ea el-Gaish Sporting Club
- Nickname: Army's Vanguards (زعيم اندية الجيش)
- Founded: 1997; 29 years ago
- Ground: Gehaz El Reyada Stadium
- Capacity: 20,000
- Chairman: Mohamed Farid
- Manager: Gomaa Mashhour
- League: Egyptian Premier League
- 2025–26: 16th
- Website: www.tgclub.com.eg

Tala'ea el-Gaish Sporting Club (Arabic: نادي طلائع الجيش الرياضي, lit. 'Army Vanguard'), also known as Army, is an Egyptian sports club based in Cairo, Egypt. The club is mainly known for its professional football team, which currently plays in the Egyptian Premier League, the top league in the Egyptian football league system.

The club also has a representative men's basketball team that competes in the Egyptian Basketball Super League.

== Honours ==
=== National ===
- Egyptian Super Cup
  - Winners: 2020–21

== Current squad ==
As of 22 September 2026

Note: Flags indicate national team as defined under FIFA eligibility rules; some limited exceptions apply. Players may hold more than one non-FIFA nationality.

No.	Pos.	Nation	Player
1	GK	EGY	Omar Radwan
2	DF	EGY	Moamen Mahmoud
3	DF	EGY	Amro Tarek
4	DF	EGY	Mohamed Camacho
5	MF	TUN	Houssem Eddine Souissi
6	DF	EGY	Khaled Stouhi
7	FW	EGY	Riga
8	DF	EGY	Ahmed Zola
9	FW	EGY	Fares Hatem
10	FW	EGY	Mohamed Hany
11	FW	EGY	Karim Tarek
12	MF	EGY	Islam Mohareb
13	MF	TOG	Arnaud Komlavi
14	MF	EGY	Ahmed Wahid
15	DF	EGY	Mahmoud Shabana

No.	Pos.	Nation	Player
18	GK	EGY	Emad El Sayed
19	DF	EGY	Hamed El Gabry
20	MF	EGY	Mahmoud Abdelaziz
21	FW	EGY	Khaled Aboziada
22	MF	EGY	Mostafa El Khawaga
24	DF	EGY	Zaghloul El Zoughbi
25	MF	EGY	Ahmed Tarek
27	DF	EGY	Ahmed Alaa
28	FW	TOG	Ismaïl Ouro-Agoro
30	FW	EGY	Mohamed Atef
31	MF	EGY	Mohamed Yasser
32	MF	EGY	Yehia Mostafa
33	FW	EGY	Ayman Amir Abdelaziz
34	DF	EGY	Hossam Awad
77	GK	EGY	Mohamed Magdy

== Managers ==
- Talaat Youssef (July 1, 2006 – June 30, 2008)
- Farouk Gaafar (Jan 10, 2008 – Jan 5, 2013)
- Emad Soliman (Feb 16, 2013 – Feb 14, 2014)
- Helmy Toulan (March 12, 2014 – June 18, 2014)
- Ahmed Samy (interim) (June 18, 2014 – Jul 20, 2014)
- Anwar Salama (Aug 17, 2014–)
- Tarek Yehia (12 November 2019 – 19 January 2020)
- Abdul-Hamid Bassiouny (19 January 2020 – 3 November 2020)
- Tarek El Ashry (3 November 2020 – 31 August 2022)
- Alaa Abdel Aal (31 August 2022 – 2 November 2022)
- Mohamed Youssef (3 November 2022 – Present)

== Other departments ==
=== Basketball ===
The club is currently active in the Egyptian Super League.

=== Handball ===
The club is currently active in the Egyptian Professional League

==== Honors ====
- Egyptian Professional League: 2007
- Egypt Cup runners-up: 2013, 2018, 2019

=== Volleyball ===
The club is currently active in the Egyptian Men's Volleyball League

==== Honors ====
- Egyptian Volleyball League: 2015–16, 2016–17
- Egypt Cup: 2014–15, 2016–17
- African Clubs Championship: 2016
- Arab Clubs Championship runners-up: 2015
