= 2015 Men's African Volleyball Championship =

Tournament details
- Host country: Egypt
- Dates: 22 – 30 July
- Teams: 9
- Venue: 1 (in 1 host city)

Final positions
- Champions: Egypt (8th title)

Tournament awards
- MVP: (Egypt) Ahmed Abdelhay

The 2015 Men's African Volleyball Championship was played in Cairo, Egypt, from July 20 to 31, 2015. The top two teams qualified for the 2015 FIVB Volleyball Men's World Cup.

== Competing nations ==
The following national teams have confirmed participation:

- Algeria
- Botswana
- Cameroon
- Egypt
- Kenya
- Mauritius
- Morocco
- Rwanda
- Tunisia

== Venues ==
Cairo	Cairo is located in Egypt
Cairo Stadium Indoor Halls Complex	Cairo is located in Egypt
Capacity: 16,900	Cairo is located in Egypt

== Format ==
The competition system of the 2015 Men's African Championship is the single Round-Robin system. Each team plays once against each of the 4 remaining teams. Points are accumulated during the whole tournament, and the final ranking is determined by the total points gained.

== Pool standing procedure ==
1. Number of matches won
2. Match points
3. Sets ratio
4. Points ratio
5. Result of the last match between the tied teams

Match won 3–0 or 3–1: 3 match points for the winner, 0 match points for the loser
Match won 3–2: 2 match points for the winner, 1 match point for the loser

== Preliminary round ==
=== Pool A ===
Pos	Team	Pld	W	L	Pts	SW	SL	SR	SPW	SPL	SPR	Qualification
1	Egypt	3	3	0	8	9	2	4.500	261	195	1.338	Championship round
2	Algeria	3	2	1	7	8	3	2.667	253	228	1.110	Championship round
3	Kenya	3	1	2	3	3	6	0.500	193	214	0.902	5th-8th classification
4	Botswana	3	0	3	0	0	9	0.000	155	225	0.689	5th-8th classification

Date	Time		Score		Set 1	Set 2	Set 3	Set 4	Set 5	Total	Report
22 Jul	20:00	Egypt	3–0	Kenya	25–19	25–14	25–18			75–51	Result
23 Jul	18:00	Botswana	0–3	Algeria	16–25	22–25	13–25			51–75	Result
24 Jul	14:00	Kenya	0–3	Algeria	17–25	26–28	23–25			66–78	Result
24 Jul	20:00	Botswana	0–3	Egypt	19–25	14–25	10–25			43–75	Result
25 Jul	14:00	Kenya	3–0	Botswana	25–19	25–19	25–23			75–61	Result
25 Jul	20:00	Algeria	2–3	Egypt	26–24	19–25	20–25	25–22	10–15	100–111	Result

=== Pool B ===
Pos	Team	Pld	W	L	Pts	SW	SL	SR	SPW	SPL	SPR	Qualification
1	Tunisia	4	3	1	10	11	4	2.750	352	266	1.323	Championship round
2	Morocco	4	3	1	9	10	4	2.500	347	294	1.180	Championship round
3	Cameroon	4	3	1	8	10	5	2.000	340	324	1.049	5th-8th classification
4	Rwanda	4	1	3	3	3	9	0.333	284	364	0.780	5th-8th classification
5	Mauritius	4	0	4	0	0	12	0.000	152	227	0.670	

Date	Time		Score		Set 1	Set 2	Set 3	Set 4	Set 5	Total	Report
22 Jul	14:00	Cameroon	3–0	Mauritius	25–21	25–19	25—18			75–40	Result
22 Jul	16:00	Morocco	3–0	Rwanda	25–23	25–13	25–17			75–53	Result
23 Jul	16:00	Rwanda	3–0	Mauritius	25–13	26–24	26–24			77–61	Result
23 Jul	20:00	Tunisia	2–3	Cameroon	23–25	25–12	25–21	22–25	12–15	107–98	Result
24 Jul	16:00	Mauritius	0–3	Tunisia	13–25	13–25	7–25			33–75	Result
24 Jul	18:00	Cameroon	1–3	Morocco	18–25	25–21	28–30	21–25		92–101	Result
25 Jul	16:00	Rwanda	0–3	Tunisia	19–25	11–25	12–25			42–75	Result
25 Jul	18:00	Morocco	3–0	Mauritius	28–26	25–11	25–17			78–54	Result
26 Jul	18:00	Cameroon	3–0	Rwanda	25–19	25–22	25–17			75–58	Result
26 Jul	20:00	Tunisia	3–1	Morocco	25–19	16–25	25–22	29–27		95–93	Result

== Final round ==
=== 5th–8th place ===
Semifinals
28 July
Kenya	2
Rwanda	3
28 July
Cameroon	3
Botswana	0

Fifth place
29 July
Rwanda	0
Cameroon	3
Seventh place
29 July
Kenya	2
Botswana	3

==== Classification 5–8 places ====
Date	Time		Score		Set 1	Set 2	Set 3	Set 4	Set 5	Total	Report
28 Jul	12:00	Kenya	2–3	Rwanda	25–17	22–25	28–26	15–25	13–15	103–108	Result
28 Jul	14:00	Cameroon	3–0	Botswana	25–21	25–13	25–17			75–51	Result

==== Seventh place match ====
Date	Time		Score		Set 1	Set 2	Set 3	Set 4	Set 5	Total	Report
29 Jul	16:00	Kenya	2–3	Botswana	25–14	25–19	21–25	20–25	13–15	104–98	Result

==== Fifth place match ====
Date	Time		Score		Set 1	Set 2	Set 3	Set 4	Set 5	Total	Report
29 Jul	18:00	Rwanda	0–3	Cameroon	19–25	23–25	22–25			64–75	Result

=== Championship ===
Semifinals
28 July
Egypt	3
Morocco	0
28 July
Tunisia	3
Algeria	2

Final
30 July
Egypt	3
Tunisia	0
Third place
30 July
Morocco	3
Algeria	1

==== Semifinals ====
Date	Time		Score		Set 1	Set 2	Set 3	Set 4	Set 5	Total	Report
28 Jul	16:00	Tunisia	3–2	Algeria	19–25	25–22	27–25	21–25	15–12	107–109	Result
28 Jul	18:00	Egypt	3–0	Morocco	25–17	28–26	25–20			78–63	Result

==== Bronze medal match ====
Date	Time		Score		Set 1	Set 2	Set 3	Set 4	Set 5	Total	Report
30 Jul	15:00	Morocco	3–1	Algeria	21–25	25–19	25–21	25–20		96–85	Result

==== Final ====
Date	Time		Score		Set 1	Set 2	Set 3	Set 4	Set 5	Total	Report
30 Jul	17:00	Egypt	3–0	Tunisia	26–24	25–18	25–21			76–63	Result

== Final standing ==
Rank	Team
1st place, gold medalist(s)	Egypt
2nd place, silver medalist(s)	Tunisia
3rd place, bronze medalist(s)	Morocco
4	Algeria
5	Cameroon
6	Rwanda
7	Botswana
8	Kenya
9	Mauritius

Qualified for the 2015 FIVB World Cup

2015 Men's African champions

Egypt
8th title

Team Roster
Abdallah Abdelsalam Bekhit, Mohamed Abou Abdelhalim, Ahmed Salahden Abdelhay, Mamdouh Abdelrehim, Mohamed Elhosseiny Thakil, Mohamed Adel Masoud, Omar Nagib Hassan, Hossam Yousif Abdalla, Mohamed Abdelmoneim Badawy, Ahmed Mohamed Elkotb, Mohamed Essameldin Moawad, Ahmed Saied Shafik
Head Coach: Angiolino Frigoni

== Awards ==
- MVP:
  (Egypt) Ahmed Abdelhay
- Best receiver:
  (Egypt) Mohamed Abdel Moneim
- Best spiker:
  (Morocco) Mohamed Al Hachdadi
- Best blocker:
  (Egypt) Mohamed Adel
- Best server:
  (Egypt) Abelhalim Abou
- Best setter:
  (Algeria) Amir Kerboua
- Best libero:
  (Tunisia) Tayeb Korbosli

== See also ==
- 2015 Women's African Volleyball Championship
