= Zamalek SC Volleyball =

Volleyball club in Giza, Egypt

Zamalek VC
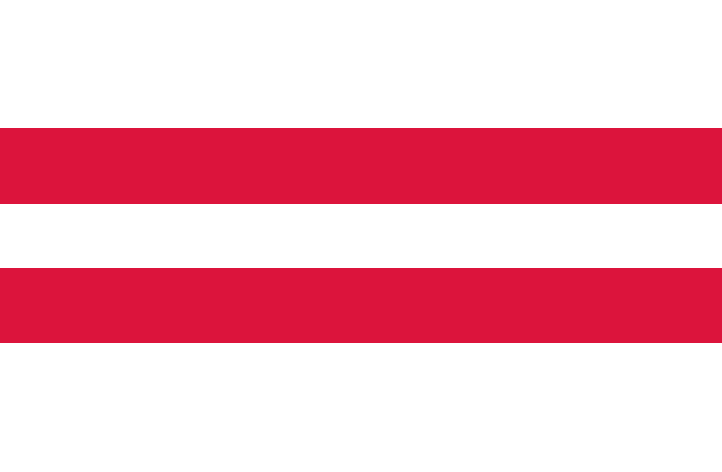
- Full name: Zamalek Sporting Club Volleyball
- Short name: ZSC, ZAM
- Founded: 1952; 74 years ago
- Ground: Abdulrahman Fawzi Hall (Capacity: 4,000)
- Chairman: Hussein Labib
- Manager: Carlos Schwanke
- Captain: Ahmed Youssef
- League: Egyptian Volleyball League
- 2025/26: 2nd
- Website: Club home page

Uniforms
Home	Away

Zamalek Volleyball Club (Arabic: نادى الزمالك للكرة الطائرة) commonly known as Zamalek V.C, or simply as Zamalek SC, is a professional volleyball team based in Giza, Egypt. founded in 1952. They compete in the Egyptian League.

The volleyball team is one of Zamalek SC club's sections that represent the club in Egypt and in international Volleyball competitions. Zamalek Volleyball team was founded in 1952. They play in the Egyptian Handball League without interruption since 1959. It has won 34 Titles in Egyptian Volleyball Federation Competitions, Also, the team has participated in African Volleyball Champions League, Since 1980. It Has Won 5 titles in African Volleyball Federation Competitions.

Zamalek has participated in FIVB Volleyball Men's Club World Championship 2 Times in 2009, 2012. Zamalek participated in the CEV Champions League In 1962-63 season, To be the 5th African team and the 1st Egyptian team to participate in the European Volleyball Federation Championships. Zamalek is the 1st African sports club to have become the African champions in both football and volleyball in the same season, 1984. 1st Egyptian team to win the Arab Clubs Championship in 1986. Zamalek volleyball team will be the most collective Sports team in Zamalek Sports Club to achieve the Egyptian League titles.

== History ==
=== Beginnings: 1952–1956 ===
The volleyball journey in Zamalek SC started in 1952. At that time, volleyball was a popular sport in Egypt as it is now. The credit for the popularity of volleyball in Zamalek goes to Helmy Zamora, one of the legends of Zamalek SC and The historical president of Zamalek club, When Helmy Zamora watched a volleyball Game in the Arab school Tournaments in Damascus, Syria, he was very impressed with the game and decided to build a volleyball team at Zamalek Club and start building a promising and strong generation for the team, whether players and coaches, And he appointed the coach of the Egyptian national team for secondary schools, Othman Shehata Hammad, to form and build a volleyball team in the Zamalek club, so that Captain Othman Shehata was the first coach in the history of the Zamalek volleyball club. In 1953, Zamalek Club participated in three Teams (First Team, Youth Team, Women's Team), in Regional tournaments, such as the Cairo Championship and the Republic Championship later. Zamalek Volleyball Teams began competing in tournaments, players’ experiences increased, the club’s popularity in volleyball grew, and they competed foreign teams that dominant a domestic tournaments at that period, such as the teams of the Greek communities in Cairo, Alexandria and Port Said. The first generation of the Zamalek volleyball club was: Mahmoud Al-Farwani, Nabil Taher, Muhammad Al-Dabaa, Faraj Al-Hamalawy, Ali Fouad, Antoine Yaghmour, Mustafa Youssef Fahmy, Hussein Al-Agati, Ahmed Talaat Saeed, Badr Al-Farwani, Mahmoud Idris, Abdel-Majid Mahmoud, Mohsen Mohamed, Sami Mahmoud Saleh, Samir Bassiouni, Nour Al-Ganouni. But this generation did not last long because most of the players of the Zamalek Volleyball Club joined the Police College, and some of them left the sport. And this team was trained by coach Mahmoud Al-Farwani, who was also a player in the team, to be the first athlete in the history of Egyptian volleyball to be a player and coach at the same time, who is considered by many as the founder of Egyptian volleyball and on the approach to handball, which was founded by a son of the Zamalek club, Al-Farwani, the son of Zamalek, became the founder of the Egyptian Volleyball, so that the sons of Zamalek would always be leaders in the history and establishment of Egyptian sports.

=== First achievement: 1957–1960 ===
Mahmoud Al-Farwani was able to establish form and build a new generation of players in the mid-fifties, which was the beginning of victories and crowning of domestic Competitions for the Zamalek Volleyball Club and coach Mahmoud Al-Farwani in breaking the dominance of Greek teams. It was the first title in the history of Zamalek club, which was a Republic League Championship, that later became the Egyptian Volleyball League. The first golden era of the Zamalek Volleyball Club began with the second generation, containing Nabil Qutb, Bahaa Abdel-Wadoud, Hani Abdel-Wadoud, Saad Zagloul, Abu Al-Dahab Muhammad, Sami Al-Sibai, Mustafa Fahmy, Essam Al-Washahi, Hossam Mandour, Nour Zaki, Emile Aziz, Salah Badir, Nabil Murad and Ali Mohamed Ali, Ahmed El-Gamal.

=== History of success: 1961–1979 ===
Zamalek succeeded in winning 13 Egyptian Volleyball League from 1961 to 1979. Which was the only Domestic tournament playing in Egypt at that time. After the departure of Captain Mahmoud Al-Farwani from training the Zamalek volleyball club, and later carrying the training to, Captain Ahmed El-Gamal, who obtained a training certificate in Leipzig and the international lecturer, who was hired by Zamalek to develop volleyball in the club. And who later became a coach for the Egyptian national volleyball team, and became the first Egyptian coach who was able to take the team to the Los Angeles Olympics, Which graduated from under his hands a lot of Egyptian players and coaches. A new generation of players began to be built, In addition to some players from the previous generation, no less efficient than the generation of the 1950s or the first generation of the Zamalek Volleyball Club, and the third generation consisted of: Jamal Ahmed, Ahmed Al-Jezy, Azmi Mujahid, Sayed Shehata, Hassan Muharram, Nour Zaki, Ehab Al-Muqawwal, Muhammad Metwally, Sami Mubarez, Ali Moussa, Ibrahim El-Khouly, Jaber Abdel-Aty. Zamalek won 7 titles in the Egyptian Volleyball League in the 1970s, with the addition of the fourth generation, which monopolized the domestic Competitions, won the title 6 times in a row. This generation was considered the best generation in the history of the Zamalek Volleyball Club, They were later joined by players like, Adel Mohamed Ali, Tariq Abdel Hakam, Osama Al-Fawal, Abdel Hamid Al-Wasimi, Mahmoud Abdel Fattah, Adel Maghawry, Mohamed Saad, Essam Zakaria. And who brought Zamalek back to win the league championship, which was absent from the club for 3 seasons. And the players of Zamalek succeeded in winning the league championship in the 1978-79 season, to end this era, and after 17 years of establishing the volleyball game in Zamalek club, they won 13 titles for the Egyptian Volleyball League, whether with the modern name or the old name, such as the Republic League and the Cairo Region Championship.

=== Golden era: 1980s ===
Zamalek won 3 titles for the Egyptian Volleyball League and 2 titles for the African Volleyball Champions League, the first of which was held in 1980. 1 Egyptian Volleyball Cup and 1 Arab volleyball Clubs Champions. Why is this generation called and this period is the golden era. Zamalek managed to reach the final match of the African Volleyball Champions League 6 times and won the title only twice, although Zamalek in that period included many good Egyptian players who represented the Egyptian volleyball team in the Los Angeles Olympics. Like, Ahmed Al-Asqalani, Essam Moawad, Muhammad Al-Laqani, Ahmed Mustafa, Abdel-Moati Mansour, Ahmed Moataz, Ahmed Abdel-Dayem, Faraj Al-Wakeel, Alaa Fahmy, Saber Abdel-Jalil, Adel Salem. Zamalek won the 1st African Volleyball Champions League title in 1984, despite failing to lose the final twice before. But Zamalek's victory in that tournament made it the best moment in the club's history, after Zamalek Football Club won the African Champions League in the same year. Making Zamalek the first club in the world to win a continental championship in volleyball and football in the same year. After Zamalek won 3 titles in the Egyptian Volleyball League in that period, Zamalek ended this era as the club that achieved the most in the Egyptian League with 17 titles. won the 1st Egyptian Cup in 1989. To achieve the Domestic Double in that season by winning the league and cup. Winning the Arab Volleyball Champions in 1986 as the 1st Egyptian team to win the title in Arab volleyball competitions, that edition carried the best event in the history of Halls Games at Zamalek Club. establishment, opening ceremony of the Abdul Rahman Fawzy Hall for Zamalek Club, which was held for the 5th edition of the Arab Volleyball Championship on the Zamalek Club Hall, so that volleyball in Zamalek Club would be the first team in the club to win the 1st title in Abdul Rahman Fawzy Hall.

== Honours ==
=== Domestic competitions ===
- Egyptian League
  - Winners (28): 1959–60, 1961–62, 1962–63, 1963–64, 1964–65, 1965–66, 1968–69, 1969–70, 1970–71, 1971–72, 1972–73, 1973–74, 1974–75, 1978–79, 1985–86, 1987–88, 1988–89, 1990–91, 1991–92, 1992–93, 1996–97, 1997–98, 2000–01, 2004–05, 2007–08, 2014–15, 2021–22, 2022–23
- Egyptian Cup
  - Winners (8): 1989, 1993, 2000, 2009, 2016, 2021, 2022, 2023
- Egyptian Super Cup
  - Winners (1): 2002

=== African competitions ===
- CAVB Champions League
  - Winners (5): 1984, 1987, 2008, 2009, 2012
  - Runners-up (9): 1980, 1983, 1985, 1986, 1993, 2002, 2010, 2021, 2023
  - Fourth-Place (2): 1991, 1998
- CAVB Winners' Cup
  - Winners (1): 2006
  - Runners-up (6): 1989, 1990, 1993, 1995, 1996, 2000
  - Third-Place (2): 1991, 1997

=== Worldwide competitions ===
- FIVB Volleyball Men's Club World Championship
  - Fifth-Place (2): 2009, 2012

=== Regional competitions ===
- Arab Clubs Championship
  - Winners (3): 1986, 1993, 2025
  - Runners-up (2): 2001, 2020
  - Third-Place (2): 1997, 2006
  - Fourth-Place (1): 1989

== Squad ==
Head coach: Ashraf Rashad

- (Egypt) Ashraf Abouelhassan (C)
- (Egypt) Mohamed abd El-monem
- (Egypt) Reda Haikal
- (Egypt) Ahmed Yousef Afifi
- (Brazil) João Rafael Ferreira
- (Cuba) Yosvany Hernandez
- (Egypt) Rashad Shebl
- (Egypt) Muhamed issa
- (Egypt) Mostafa Mohamed
- (Egypt) Seif Abed
- (Egypt) Ahmed fathy
- (Egypt) Hisham Yousri
- (Egypt) Ashraf M. Ellakany
- (Egypt) Ahmed Diaa
- (Egypt) Mohamed Elmahdy
- (Egypt) Mohamed Reda
- (Egypt) Ahmed Azmy
- (Egypt) Abdelrhaman Tawfik
- (Egypt) Mohamed Magdy

== Former club members ==
=== Notable former players ===
- João Rafael
- Yosvany Hernandez

== Crest and colors ==
Logo a mixture of the sporting model and the ancient Egyptian civilization. The logo's main colors express peace and struggle and have not changed since its establishment. The home jersey uses the original Zamalek colours, In the upper half of the logo, the arrow that points towards the target appears in a pharaonic uniform as an indication of the common goal between it and Zamalek, Zamalek is famous for the stability of its basic colors, which have not changed throughout the club's history, which extends since 1911, as it is distinguished by the white kits with two parallel red lines in the middle. The team shirt is displayed on the chest, and the color symbolizes.

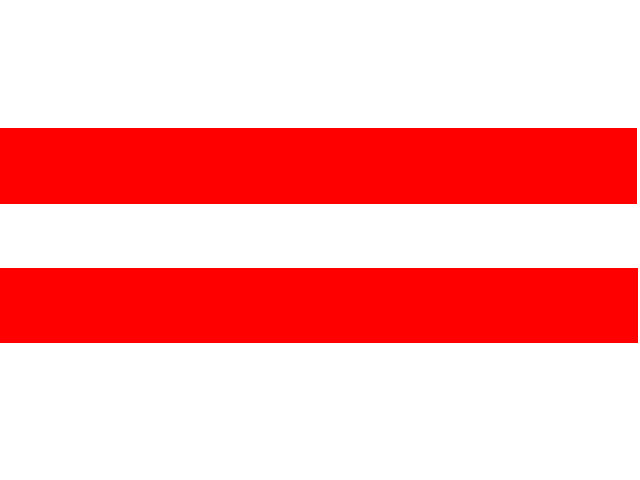

== Home arena ==
Location	Arena's name	Period
Giza	Abdulrahman Fawzi Hall	1986 – Present

When Zamalek SC began to create the teams of Handball, Basketball and Volleyball, they saw the importance to build an arena to host the home matches of these teams. They first began to make the designs in 1970s, later they began working to build the covered hall, which was established in 1986, which they named of Abdulrahman Fawzi Hall, in the honour of one of the legend of Zamalek SC, he was the first ever Arab and African footballer to score at the FIFA World Cup, when he scored twice for Egypt in their 4–2 loss against Hungary in 1934, he is also Egypt's top goalscorer at the FIFA World Cup.

The opening ceremony of Abdulrahman Fawzi Hall was held with the opening ceremony of the 5th Arab Volleyball Championship in 1986, which was won by Zamalek volleyball team for the first time in the club's history, defeating MC Alger in the final which was held in Abdulrahman Fawzi Hall.

== Supporters ==
Zamalek has an ultras group named the Ultras White Knights that was founded on 17 March 2007 and is known for its pyrotechnic displays. Their motto is "Brotherhood in blood and fans of the free public Club". They were involved in clashes on 8 February 2015 before the league match between Zamalek and ENPI Club at the Cairo Air Defense Stadium, where 20 people were killed. The Zamalek fans have always been supportive of all sports games of the Zamalek club, And the fans of Zamalek were the first to launch the term kings of the halls in Africa and the Arab world, as the sports games in Zamalek Club achieved international and local achievements. The fans of Zamalek have always been associated with the Hall Games from the 90s until now.
