= Wiesław Gawłowski =

Polish volleyball player (1950–2000)

Personal information
- Full name: Wiesław Stanisław Gawłowski
- Born: 19 May 1950 Tomaszów Mazowiecki, Poland
- Died: 14 November 2000 (aged 50) Białobrzegi, Poland
- Height: 180 cm (5 ft 11 in)

Volleyball information
- Position: Setter

Career
- Years: Team
- 1969–1973 1973–1980 1980–1985 1985–1990: AZS AWF Warsaw; Płomień Milowice; Vianello Pescara; Pallavolo Pineto

National team
- Years: Team
- 1969–1980: Poland (366)
Honours
Men's volleyball
Representing Poland
Olympic Games
Gold medal – first place	1976 Montreal
FIVB World Championship
Gold medal – first place	1974 Mexico
CEV European Championship
Silver medal – second place	1975 Yugoslavia
Silver medal – second place	1977 Finland
Silver medal – second place	1979 France

Wiesław Stanisław Gawłowski (19 May 1950 – 14 November 2000) was a Polish volleyball player and coach. He was a member of the Poland national team with which he won gold medals in the 1974 World Championship and the 1976 Summer Olympics.

== Personal life ==
Wiesław Gawłowski was born in Tomaszów Mazowiecki, Poland. He attended the University of Physical Education in Warsaw, graduating in 1974. He had a wife, Barbara, and two sons, Maciej and Wojciech.

== Honours ==
=== Club ===
- CEV European Champions Cup
  - 1977–78 – with Płomień Milowice
- Domestic
  - 1976–77 Polish Championship, with Płomień Milowice
  - 1978–79 Polish Championship, with Płomień Milowice

== Death ==
Wiesław Gawłowski died in a car crash in Białobrzegi, near Płock.
