= Hubert Wagner =

Polish volleyball player

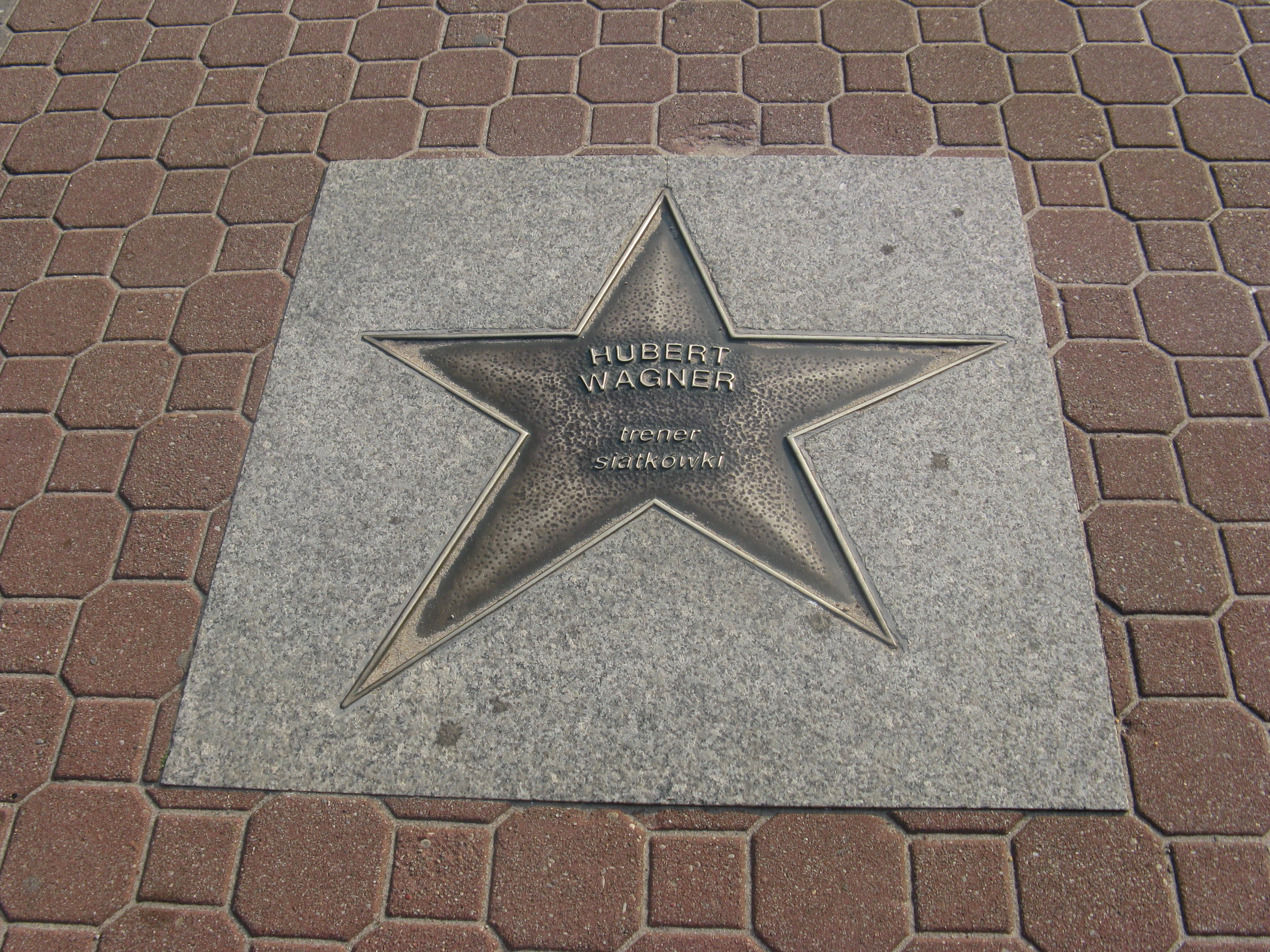

Personal information
- Full name: Hubert Aleksander Wagner
- Nickname: Jurek, Gruby, Kat
- Born: 4 March 1941; Poznań, Poland
- Died: 13 March 2002 (aged 61); Warsaw, Poland

Coaching information
Previous teams coached
| Years | Teams |
|---|---|
| 1973–1976; 1977–1985; 1978–1979; 1983–1985; 1986–1987; 1987–1988; 1991–1993; 1994–1995; 1996–1997; 1996–1998; 1997–1998; 1997–1999; 1999–2000 | Poland; Legia Warsaw; Poland (W); Poland; Filament Bursa; Tunisia; Halkbank Ankara; Stilon Gorzów Wielkopolski; Skra Warsaw (W); Poland; Dick Black Andrychów (W); Morze Bałtyk Szczecin; Legia Warsaw |

Career
| Years | Teams |
|---|---|
| | AZS Poznań; AZS AWF Warsaw; Skra Warsaw |

National team
| 1963–1971 | Poland (194) |
Honours
Men's volleyball
Representing Poland
CEV European Championship
| Bronze medal – third place | 1967 Turkey |
Head coach Poland
Olympic Games
| Gold medal – first place | 1976 Montreal |
FIVB World Championship
| Gold medal – first place | 1974 Mexico |
CEV European Championship
| Silver medal – second place | 1975 Yugoslavia |
| Silver medal – second place | 1983 East Germany |
Head coach Tunisia
CAVB African Championship
| Gold medal – first place | 1987 Tunisia |

Hubert Aleksander Wagner (a.k.a. Hubert Jerzy Wagner; 4 March 1941 – 13 March 2002) was a Polish volleyball player and coach. He was a member of the Poland national team from 1963 to 1971, a participant in the Mexico 1968 Olympics, and a bronze medallist at the 1967 European Championship. As a head coach, he led Poland to become the 1974 World Champions and the 1976 Olympic Champions.

== Personal life ==
Wagner was born in Poznań. His parents were Romuald and Zofia (née Kotlińska). He had two younger siblings, Elżbieta (born 1946) and Leszek.

Wagner was married twice. On 15 October 1963, he married Danuta Kordaczuk, an Olympic medal winning volleyball player with medals in the World and European Championships. The couple had one son, Grzegorz Wagner (born 1965), a professional volleyball setter and coach. The couple divorced in 1978.

In 1979, he married Anna Baraniecka. In the last two years of his life, his partner was Danuta Marzec. He had three grandchildren: Iwo (born 1991), who played as a setter and is now a scout; Jakub (born 1993), who is also a volleyball player; and Sara (born 2003).

== Coaching ==
In 1973, he became head coach of the Polish men's national volleyball team at 32 years old. He was demanding and greatly valued physical preparation of his players. In 1974, he led the team to win the Volleyball Men's World Championship. In the subsequent year, they won silver in the European Championship 1975 held in Yugoslavia.

On 30 July 1976, the national men's volleyball team became the 1976 Olympic Champions. Despite Polish volleyball players spending 11 1/2 hours on the court while their opponents only spent five hours, Wagner's team still beat the Soviet Union in a tie-break. Two months after this success, he left the national team.

== Honours ==
=== As a player ===
- Domestic
  - 1962–63 Polish Championship, with AZS AWF Warsaw
  - 1964–65 Polish Championship, with AZS AWF Warsaw
  - 1965–66 Polish Championship, with AZS AWF Warsaw
  - 1967–68 Polish Championship, with AZS AWF Warsaw

=== As a coach ===
- Domestic
  - 1982–83 Polish Championship, with Legia Warsaw
  - 1991–92 Turkish Championship, with Halkbank Ankara
  - 1992–93 Turkish Championship, with Halkbank Ankara

== Death ==
On 13 March 2002, after a meeting with the Polish Association of Volleyball in Warsaw, Wagner suffered a car accident triggered by a heart attack. Despite rapid resuscitation, he died. An autopsy showed advanced coronary artery disease. He was buried at the Northern Communal Cemetery in Warsaw.

== Legacy ==
The Memorial of Hubert Jerzy Wagner is an annual three-day volleyball tournament with four national teams invited by Poland held since 2003.

Wagner was admitted to the International Volleyball Hall of Fame in 2010.

Five schools and two sports arenas in Poland are named after him.

Sporting positions
| Preceded by (Poland) Tadeusz Szlagor | Head coach of Poland; 1973–1976 | Succeeded by (Poland) Jerzy Welcz |
| Preceded by (Poland) Aleksander Skiba | Head coach of Poland; 1983–1986 | Succeeded by (Poland) Stanisław Gościniak |
| Preceded by (Poland) Wiktor Krebok | Head coach of Poland; 1996–1998 | Succeeded by (Poland) Ireneusz Mazur |
