= Włodzimierz Stefański =

Polish volleyball player

Personal information
- Full name: Włodzimierz Andrzej Stefański
- Born: 20 November 1949 (age 76) Wrocław, Poland

Volleyball information

Career
- Years: Team
- 1967–1970 1970–1972 1972–1973 1973–1977 1977–1980: Gwardia Wrocław; Skra Warsaw; AZS AWF Warsaw; Resovia; Legia Warsaw

National team
- Years: Team
- 1969–1980: Poland (267)
Honours
Men's volleyball
Representing Poland
Olympic Games
Gold medal – first place	1976 Montreal
FIVB World Championship
Gold medal – first place	1974 Mexico
CEV European Championship
Silver medal – second place	1975 Yugoslavia
Silver medal – second place	1977 Finland

Włodzimierz Andrzej Stefański (born 20 November 1949) is a Polish former volleyball player, a member of the Poland national team from 1969 to 1980. During his career, he won the titles of the 1976 Olympic Champion and the 1974 World Champion.

== Personal life ==
He was born in Wrocław, Poland. He lives in Finland.

== Honours ==
=== Club ===
- Domestic
  - 1973–74 Polish Championship, with Resovia
  - 1974–75 Polish Cup, with Resovia
  - 1974–75 Polish Championship, with Resovia
