= Russia men's national volleyball team =

National sports team

Russia
- Nickname(s): Reds Caesar Land
- Association: Russian Volleyball Federation (VFV)
- Confederation: CEV
- Head coach: Konstantin Bryanskiyly
- FIVB ranking: 3 (15 October 2026)

Uniforms
| Home | Away | Third |

Summer Olympics
- Appearances: 14 (First in 1964)
- Best result: (1964 (USSR)), (1968 (USSR)), (1980 (USSR)), (2012)

World Championship
- Appearances: 18 (First in 1949)
- Best result: (1949 (USSR), 1952 (USSR), 1960 (USSR), 1962 (USSR), 1978 (USSR), 1982 (USSR))

World Cup
- Appearances: 11 (First in 1965)
- Best result: (1965 (USSR), 1977 (USSR), 1981 (USSR), 1991 (USSR), 1999, 2011)

European Championship
- Appearances: 28 (First in 1950 (as USSR))
- Best result: (1950 (USSR), 1951 (USSR), 1967 (USSR), 1971 (USSR), 1975 (USSR), 1977 (USSR), 1979 (USSR), 1981 (USSR), 1983 (USSR), 1985 (USSR), 1987 (USSR), 1991 (USSR), 2013, 2017)
- www.volley.ru (in Russian)
Honours
Olympic Games
| Gold medal – first place | 1964 Tokyo | Team (URS) |
| Gold medal – first place | 1968 Mexico City | Team (URS) |
| Gold medal – first place | 1980 Moscow | Team (URS) |
| Gold medal – first place | 2012 London | Team |
| Silver medal – second place | 1976 Montreal | Team (URS) |
| Silver medal – second place | 1988 Seoul | Team (URS) |
| Silver medal – second place | 2000 Sydney | Team |
| Silver medal – second place | 2020 Tokyo | Team |
| Bronze medal – third place | 1972 Munich | Team (URS) |
| Bronze medal – third place | 2004 Athens | Team |
| Bronze medal – third place | 2008 Beijing | Team |
World Championship
| Gold medal – first place | 1949 Czechoslovakia (URS) |
| Gold medal – first place | 1952 Soviet Union (URS) |
| Gold medal – first place | 1960 Brazil (URS) |
| Gold medal – first place | 1962 Soviet Union (URS) |
| Gold medal – first place | 1978 Italy (URS) |
| Gold medal – first place | 1982 Argentina (URS) |
| Silver medal – second place | 1974 Mexico (URS) |
| Silver medal – second place | 1986 France (URS) |
| Silver medal – second place | 2002 Argentina |
| Bronze medal – third place | 1956 France (URS) |
| Bronze medal – third place | 1966 Czechoslovakia (URS) |
| Bronze medal – third place | 1990 Brazil (URS) |
World Cup
| Gold medal – first place | 1965 Poland (URS) |
| Gold medal – first place | 1977 Japan (URS) |
| Gold medal – first place | 1981 Japan (URS) |
| Gold medal – first place | 1991 Japan (URS) |
| Gold medal – first place | 1999 Japan |
| Gold medal – first place | 2011 Japan |
| Silver medal – second place | 1985 Japan (URS) |
| Silver medal – second place | 2007 Japan |
| Bronze medal – third place | 1969 East Germany (URS) |
| Bronze medal – third place | 1989 Japan (URS) |
World Grand Champions Cup
| Silver medal – second place | 2013 Japan |
World League
| Gold medal – first place | 2002 Belo Horizonte |
| Gold medal – first place | 2011 Gdańsk |
| Gold medal – first place | 2013 Mar del Plata |
| Silver medal – second place | 1993 São Paulo |
| Silver medal – second place | 1998 Milan |
| Silver medal – second place | 2000 Rotterdam |
| Silver medal – second place | 2007 Katowice |
| Silver medal – second place | 2010 Córdoba |
| Bronze medal – third place | 1991 Milan (URS) |
| Bronze medal – third place | 1996 Rotterdam |
| Bronze medal – third place | 1997 Moscow |
| Bronze medal – third place | 2001 Katowice |
| Bronze medal – third place | 2006 Moscow |
| Bronze medal – third place | 2008 Rio de Janeiro |
| Bronze medal – third place | 2009 Belgrade |
Nations League
| Gold medal – first place | 2018 Lille |
| Gold medal – first place | 2019 Chicago |
European Championship
| Gold medal – first place | 1950 Bulgaria (URS) |
| Gold medal – first place | 1951 France (URS) |
| Gold medal – first place | 1967 Turkey (URS) |
| Gold medal – first place | 1971 Italy (URS) |
| Gold medal – first place | 1975 Yugoslavia (URS) |
| Gold medal – first place | 1977 Finland (URS) |
| Gold medal – first place | 1979 France (URS) |
| Gold medal – first place | 1981 Bulgaria (URS) |
| Gold medal – first place | 1983 East Germany (URS) |
| Gold medal – first place | 1985 Netherlands (URS) |
| Gold medal – first place | 1987 Belgium (URS) |
| Gold medal – first place | 1991 Germany (URS) |
| Gold medal – first place | 2013 Denmark/Poland |
| Gold medal – first place | 2017 Poland |
| Silver medal – second place | 1999 Austria |
| Silver medal – second place | 2005 Italy/Serbia and Montenegro |
| Silver medal – second place | 2007 Russia |
| Bronze medal – third place | 1958 Czechoslovakia (URS) |
| Bronze medal – third place | 1963 Romania (URS) |
| Bronze medal – third place | 1993 Finland |
| Bronze medal – third place | 2001 Czech Republic |
| Bronze medal – third place | 2003 Germany |
European Games
| Bronze medal – third place | 2015 Baku | Team |
European League
| Gold medal – first place | 2005 Kazan |
| Silver medal – second place | 2004 Opava |
Summer Universiade
| Gold medal – first place | 2009 Belgrade | Team |
| Gold medal – first place | 2011 Shenzhen | Team |
| Gold medal – first place | 2013 Kazan | Team |
| Gold medal – first place | 2015 Gwangju | Team |
| Silver medal – second place | 2017 Taipei | Team |
| Bronze medal – third place | 1997 Sicily | Team |
| Bronze medal – third place | 2001 Beijing | Team |
| Bronze medal – third place | 2019 Naples | Team |
Goodwill Games
| Gold medal – first place | 1986 Moscow | Team |
| Silver medal – second place | 1990 Seattle | Team |

The Russia men's national volleyball team is governed by the Russian Volleyball Federation and represents Russia in international volleyball competitions.

The FIVB considers Russia as successor to the records of Soviet Union (1948–1991) and Commonwealth of Independent States (CIS) (1992). The USSR Volleyball Federation joined the FIVB in 1948, a year after the foundation of the international governing body. The following year they sent a team to compete in the first FIVB Men's World Championship and have been dominating the international scene ever since, having won six World Championships, four Olympic Games, six World Cups and 14 European Championships (medals of Russian and the Soviet union combined).

On 28 February 2022, following the Russian invasion of Ukraine and in accordance with a "recommendation" by the International Olympic Committee (IOC), FIVB and CEV suspended the participation of Russia in their competitions.

On July 8, 2026, the International Volleyball Federation (FIVB) announced that Russian athletes and technical officials in all disciplines would be allowed to return to FIVB, World and Official competitions, following the International Olympic Committee Executive Board's decision that its previously recommended conditions of participation for Russian athletes and teams were no longer applicable. The Russian national teams were restored to the FIVB World Rankings with the same ranking points they held when their points were frozen. The FIVB also stated that the display of the Russian flag, anthem, colors and other national identifications would be determined by the FIVB and the European Volleyball Confederation (CEV) at a later date, in consultation with relevant international sports organizations.

On August 4, 2026, following consultations with relevant stakeholders, the FIVB confirmed that the Russian men's and women's national teams would participate in the 2027 Volleyball Nations League (VNL) as the highest-ranked teams not yet qualified for the competition. For the 2027 edition, the VNL will expand from 18 to 19 teams in each gender category to accommodate their participation while also ensuring the participation of the Slovenia Women's National team and Finland Men's National team, which were due to qualify based on their performances in previous seasons. The FIVB also stated that the Russian Volleyball Federation had notified it that Russia's men's national team would not participate in the 2027 FIVB Men's Volleyball World Cup, which is scheduled to be held in Poland.

== History ==
The USSR Volleyball Federation joined the FIVB in 1948, and the following year Soviet Union sent a team to compete at the first FIVB Men's World Championship. The Soviet Union won the inaugural championship with a perfect record of eight victories, while Czechoslovakia finished in second place.

== Medals ==
| Event | Gold | Silver | Bronze | Total |
|---|---|---|---|---|
| Olympic Games | 4 | 4 | 3 | 11 |
| World Championship | 6 | 3 | 3 | 12 |
| World Cup | 6 | 2 | 2 | 10 |
| World Grand Champions Cup | 0 | 1 | 0 | 1 |
| World League | 3 | 5 | 7 | 15 |
| Nations League | 2 | 0 | 0 | 2 |
| European Championship | 14 | 3 | 5 | 22 |
| European Games | 0 | 0 | 1 | 1 |
| European League | 1 | 1 | 0 | 2 |
| Summer Univesiade | 4 | 1 | 3 | 8 |
| Goodwill Games | 1 | 1 | 0 | 2 |
| Total | 41 | 21 | 24 | 86 |

== Competition record ==
=== Olympic Games ===
Champions Runners up Third place Fourth place

| Olympic Games record | | | | | | | | | Qualification record | | | | | |
| Year | Round | Position | GP | MW | ML | SW | SL | Squad | Round | Pos | MW | ML | SW | SL |
|---|---|---|---|---|---|---|---|---|---|---|---|---|---|---|
| (Japan) 1964 | Final | 1st | 9 | 8 | 1 | 25 | 5 | Squad | Qualified, World Champions | | | | | |
| (Mexico) 1968 | Final | 1st | 9 | 8 | 1 | 26 | 8 | Squad | Qualified, as defending Olympic Champions | | | | | |
| (Germany) 1972 | Semifinals | 3rd | 7 | 6 | 1 | 19 | 6 | Squad | Qualified, as defending Olympic Champions | | | | | |
| (Canada) 1976 | Final | 2nd | 5 | 4 | 1 | 14 | 3 | Squad | Qualified, as European Champions | | | | | |
| (Soviet Union) 1980 | Final | 1st | 6 | 6 | 0 | 18 | 2 | Squad | Qualified, as host country | | | | | |
| (United States) 1984 | Boycotted | | | | | | | | Boycotted | | | | | |
| (South Korea) 1988 | Final | 2nd | 7 | 5 | 2 | 18 | 7 | Squad | Qualified, as World Cup runners-up | | | | | |
| (Spain) 1992 | Quarterfinals | 7th | 8 | 4 | 4 | 17 | 15 | Squad | Qualified, as European Champions | | | | | |
| (United States) 1996 | Semifinals | 4th | 8 | 3 | 5 | 11 | 15 | Squad | Final | Champions | 3 | 0 | 9 | 2 |
| (Australia) 2000 | Final | 2nd | 8 | 6 | 2 | 19 | 13 | Squad | Qualified, World Cup champions | | | | | |
| (Greece) 2004 | Semifinals | 3rd | 8 | 5 | 3 | 17 | 13 | Squad | Final | Champions | 5 | 0 | 15 | 0 |
| (China) 2008 | Semifinals | 3rd | 8 | 6 | 2 | 22 | 11 | Squad | Qualified, World Cup runners-up | | | | | |
| (United Kingdom) 2012 | Final | 1st | 8 | 7 | 1 | 21 | 8 | Squad | Qualified, World Cup champions | | | | | |
| (Brazil) 2016 | Semifinals | 4th | 8 | 5 | 3 | 18 | 12 | Squad | Final | Champions | 4 | 1 | 13 | 5 |
| (Japan) 2020 | Final | 2nd | 8 | 6 | 2 | 21 | 9 | Squad | Final | Champions | 3 | 0 | 9 | 0 |
| (France) 2024 | Banned | | | | | | | | Banned | | | | | |
| (United States) 2028 | To be Determined | | | | | | | | To be Determined | | | | | |
| (Australia) 2032 | To be Determined | | | | | | | | To be Determined | | | | | |
| Total | 4 Titles | 13/14 | 107 | 79 | 28 | 266 | 127 | — | | | | | | |

=== World Championship ===
Champions Runners up Third place Fourth place

World Championship record
| Year | Round | Position | GP | MW | ML | SW | SL | Squad |
|---|---|---|---|---|---|---|---|---|
| (Czechoslovakia) 1949 | Final Group | 1st | 8 | 8 | 0 | 24 | 2 | Squad |
| (Soviet Union) 1952 | Final Group | 1st | 8 | 8 | 0 | 24 | 0 | Squad |
| (France) 1956 | Final Group | 3rd | 11 | 9 | 2 | 30 | 10 | Squad |
| (Brazil) 1960 | Final Group | 1st | 10 | 10 | 0 | 24 | 5 | Squad |
| (Soviet Union) 1962 | Final Group | 1st | 11 | 11 | 0 | 33 | 6 | Squad |
| (Czechoslovakia) 1966 | Final Group | 3rd | 11 | 7 | 4 | 29 | 15 | Squad |
| (Bulgaria) 1970 | Final Group | 6th | 11 | 6 | 5 | 22 | 16 | Squad |
| (Mexico) 1974 | Final Group | 2nd | 11 | 8 | 3 | 27 | 10 | Squad |
| (Italy) 1978 | Final Group | 1st | 9 | 9 | 0 | 27 | 3 | Squad |
| (Argentina) 1982 | Final | 1st | 9 | 9 | 0 | 27 | 2 | Squad |
| (France) 1986 | Final | 2nd | 8 | 7 | 1 | 22 | 5 | Squad |
| (Brazil) 1990 | Semifinals | 3rd | 7 | 5 | 2 | 18 | 6 | Squad |
| (Greece) 1994 | Quarterfinals | 7th | 7 | 4 | 3 | 15 | 11 | Squad |
| (Japan) 1998 | 5th–8th places | 5th | 12 | 10 | 2 | 33 | 11 | Squad |
| (Argentina) 2002 | Final | 2nd | 9 | 6 | 3 | 21 | 15 | Squad |
| (Japan) 2006 | 5th–8th semifinals | 7th | 11 | 8 | 3 | 26 | 10 | Squad |
| (Italy) 2010 | 5th place match | 5th | 9 | 7 | 2 | 24 | 10 | Squad |
| (Poland) 2014 | 5th place match | 5th | 12 | 9 | 3 | 30 | 13 | Squad |
| (Italy) (Bulgaria) 2018 | Third round | 6th | 13 | 7 | 6 | 23 | 14 | Squad |
| (Poland) (Slovenia) 2022 | Banned by FIVB | | | | | | | |
| (Philippines) 2025 | Banned by FIVB | | | | | | | |
| (Poland) 2027 | Refused from participation | | | | | | | |
| (Qatar) 2029 | To be determined | | | | | | | |
| Total | 6 Titles | 19/20 | 187 | 148 | 39 | 479 | 164 | — |

=== World Cup ===
Champions Runners up Third place Fourth place

World Cup record
| Year | Round | Position | GP | MW | ML | SW | SL | Squad |
|---|---|---|---|---|---|---|---|---|
| (Poland) 1965 | | Champions | 7 | 6 | 1 | 20 | 7 | Squad |
| (East Germany) 1969 | | 3rd Place | 6 | 4 | 2 | 13 | 8 | Squad |
| (Japan) 1977 | | Champions | 8 | 7 | 1 | 23 | 5 | Squad |
| (Japan) 1981 | Round Robin | Champions | 7 | 7 | 0 | 21 | 2 | Squad |
| (Japan) 1985 | Round Robin | Runners-up | 7 | 5 | 2 | 18 | 8 | Squad |
| (Japan) 1989 | Round Robin | 3rd Place | 7 | 5 | 2 | 16 | 11 | Squad |
| (Japan) 1991 | Round Robin | Champions | 8 | 7 | 1 | 22 | 4 | Squad |
| (Japan) 1995 | did not participate | | | | | | | |
| (Japan) 1999 | Round Robin | Champions | 11 | 9 | 2 | 31 | 11 | Squad |
| (Japan) 2003 | did not participate | | | | | | | |
| (Japan) 2007 | Round Robin | Runners-up | 11 | 9 | 2 | 29 | 9 | Squad |
| (Japan) 2011 | Round Robin | Champions | 11 | 10 | 1 | 30 | 8 | Squad |
| (Japan) 2015 | Round Robin | 4th place | 11 | 8 | 3 | 25 | 12 | Squad |
| (Japan) 2019 | Round Robin | 6th place | 11 | 5 | 6 | 20 | 23 | Squad |
| Total | 6 Titles | 12/14 | 105 | 82 | 23 | 268 | 108 | — |

=== World Grand Champions Cup ===
- 2013 – (silver) Silver medal

=== World League ===
Champions Runners up Third place Fourth place

World League record
| Year | Round | Position | GP | MW | ML | SW | SL | Squad |
|---|---|---|---|---|---|---|---|---|
| (Japan) 1990 | Semifinals | 4th Place | 14 | 8 | 6 | 29 | 21 | Squad |
| (Italy) 1991 | Semifinals | 3rd Place | 18 | 12 | 6 | 46 | 28 | Squad |
| (Italy) 1992 | Playoff Round | 6th Place | 18 | 10 | 8 | 32 | 28 | Squad |
| (Brazil) 1993 | Final | Runners-up | 22 | 17 | 5 | 54 | 27 | Squad |
| (Italy) 1994 | Final Round | 6th Place | 14 | 10 | 4 | 34 | 14 | Squad |
| (Brazil) 1995 | Final Round | 4th Place | 17 | 12 | 5 | 43 | 22 | Squad |
| (Netherlands) 1996 | Final Round | 3rd Place | 17 | 15 | 2 | 47 | 17 | Squad |
| (Russia) 1997 | Final Round | 3rd Place | 17 | 4 | 15 | 22 | 41 | Squad |
| (Italy) 1998 | Final | Runners-up | 18 | 13 | 5 | 42 | 25 | Squad |
| (Argentina) 1999 | Semifinals | 4th Place | 16 | 12 | 4 | 40 | 24 | Squad |
| (Netherlands) 2000 | Final | Runners-up | 18 | 12 | 6 | 46 | 24 | Squad |
| (Poland) 2001 | Final | 3rd Place | 17 | 11 | 6 | 41 | 23 | Squad |
| (Brazil) 2002 | Final | Champions | 17 | 14 | 3 | 45 | 20 | Squad |
| (Spain) 2003 | Final Round | 7th Place | 15 | 11 | 3 | 36 | 21 | Squad |
| (Italy) 2004 | did not compete | | | | | | | |
| (Serbia and Montenegro) 2005 | did not compete | | | | | | | |
| (Russia) 2006 | Semifinals | 3rd Place | 17 | 11 | 6 | 42 | 24 | Squad |
| (Poland) 2007 | Final | Runners-up | 16 | 12 | 4 | 39 | 17 | Squad |
| (Brazil) 2008 | Semifinals | 3rd Place | 16 | 12 | 4 | 39 | 24 | Squad |
| (Serbia) 2009 | Semifinals | 3rd Place | 16 | 10 | 6 | 35 | 23 | Squad |
| (Argentina) 2010 | Final | Runners-up | 16 | 13 | 3 | 41 | 27 | Squad |
| (Poland) 2011 | Final | Champions | 17 | 16 | 1 | 49 | 13 | Squad |
| (Poland) 2012 | Intercontinental Round | 8th Place | 12 | 8 | 4 | 29 | 23 | Squad |
| (Argentina) 2013 | Final | Champions | 14 | 10 | 4 | 32 | 18 | Squad |
| (Italy) 2014 | Final Round | 5th Place | 14 | 8 | 6 | 32 | 21 | Squad |
| (Brazil) 2015 | Intercontinental Round | 8th Place | 12 | 1 | 11 | 11 | 34 | Squad |
| (Poland) 2016 | Intercontinental Round | 7th Place | 9 | 5 | 4 | 15 | 14 | Squad |
| (Brazil) 2017 | Final Round | 5th Place | 11 | 5 | 6 | 21 | 22 | Squad |
| Total | 3 Titles | 26/28 | 408 | 271 | 137 | 910 | 595 | — |

=== Nations League ===
Champions Runners up Third place Fourth place

Nations League record
| Year | Round | Position | GP | MW | ML | SW | SL | Squad |
|---|---|---|---|---|---|---|---|---|
| (France) 2018 | Final | 1st | 19 | 15 | 4 | 48 | 15 | Squad |
| (United States) 2019 | Final | 1st | 19 | 15 | 4 | 46 | 22 | Squad |
| (Italy) 2021 | Preliminary round | 5th | 15 | 11 | 4 | 39 | 21 | Squad |
| (Italy) 2022 | Banned by FIVB | | | | | | | |
| (Poland) 2023 | Banned by FIVB | | | | | | | |
| (Poland) 2024 | Banned by FIVB | | | | | | | |
| (China) 2025 | Banned by FIVB | | | | | | | |
| (China) 2026 | Banned by FIVB | | | | | | | |
| (China) 2027 | Qualified | | | | | | | |
| Total | 2 Titles | 3/8 | 53 | 41 | 12 | 133 | 58 | — |

=== European Championship ===
Champions Runners up Third place Fourth place

European Championship record
| Year | Round | Position | GP | MW | ML | SW | SL | Squad |
|---|---|---|---|---|---|---|---|---|
| (Italy) 1948 | did not enter | | | | | | | |
| (Bulgaria) 1950 | Round Robin | Champions | 5 | 5 | 0 | 15 | 0 | Squad |
| (France) 1951 | Final Group | Champions | 7 | 7 | 0 | 21 | 0 | Squad |
| (Romania) 1955 | Final Group | 4th Place | 10 | 7 | 3 | 25 | 12 | Squad |
| (Czechoslovakia) 1958 | Final Group | 3rd Place | 11 | 8 | 3 | 29 | 13 | Squad |
| (Romania) 1963 | Final Group | 3rd Place | 9 | 6 | 3 | 24 | 16 | Squad |
| (Turkey) 1967 | Final Group | Champions | 10 | 10 | 0 | 30 | 6 | Squad |
| (Italy) 1971 | Final Group | Champions | 6 | 5 | 1 | 15 | 4 | Squad |
| (Socialist Federal Republic of Yugoslavia) 1975 | Final Group | Champions | 7 | 7 | 0 | 21 | 3 | Squad |
| (Finland) 1977 | Final | Champions | 7 | 6 | 1 | 19 | 5 | Squad |
| (France) 1979 | Final Group | Champions | 7 | 7 | 0 | 21 | 3 | Squad |
| (Bulgaria) 1981 | Final Group | Champions | 7 | 7 | 0 | 21 | 3 | Squad |
| (East Germany) 1983 | Final Group | Champions | 7 | 7 | 0 | 21 | 3 | Squad |
| (Netherlands) 1985 | Final Group | Champions | 7 | 7 | 0 | 21 | 2 | Squad |
| (Belgium) 1987 | Final | Champions | 7 | 7 | 0 | 21 | 5 | Squad |
| (Sweden) 1989 | Semifinals | 4th Place | 7 | 5 | 2 | 17 | 10 | Squad |
| (Germany) 1991 | Final | Champions | 7 | 7 | 0 | 21 | 1 | Squad |
| (Finland) 1993 | Semifinals | 3rd Place | 7 | 6 | 1 | 18 | 6 | Squad |
| (Greece) 1995 | Groups Round | 5th Place | 7 | 5 | 2 | 18 | 8 | Squad |
| (Netherlands) 1997 | Groups Round | 5th Place | 7 | 4 | 3 | 16 | 9 | Squad |
| (Austria) 1999 | Final | Runners-up | 5 | 4 | 1 | 13 | 5 | Squad |
| (Czech Republic) 2001 | Semifinals | 3rd Place | 7 | 5 | 2 | 15 | 11 | Squad |
| (Germany) 2003 | Semifinals | 3rd Place | 7 | 7 | 0 | 21 | 4 | Squad |
| (Italy) 2005 | Final | Runners-up | 7 | 6 | 1 | 20 | 10 | Squad |
| (Russia) 2007 | Final | Runners-up | 8 | 7 | 1 | 23 | 7 | Squad |
| (Turkey) 2009 | Semifinals | 4th Place | 8 | 6 | 2 | 20 | 10 | Squad |
| (Austria) (Czech Republic) 2011 | Semifinals | 4th Place | 6 | 4 | 2 | 15 | 8 | Squad |
| (Denmark) (Poland) 2013 | Final | Champions | 7 | 6 | 1 | 18 | 7 | Squad |
| (Bulgaria) (Italy) 2015 | Quarterfinals | 6th Place | 4 | 3 | 1 | 9 | 4 | Squad |
| (Poland) 2017 | Final | Champions | 6 | 6 | 0 | 18 | 2 | Squad |
| (Belgium) (France) (Netherlands) (Slovenia) 2019 | Quarterfinals | 5th Place | 7 | 6 | 1 | 19 | 5 | Squad |
| (Czech Republic) (Estonia) (Finland) (Poland) 2021 | Quarterfinals | 7th Place | 7 | 5 | 2 | 16 | 11 | Squad |
| (Italy) (Bulgaria) (North Macedonia) (Israel) 2023 | Banned by FIVB | | | | | | | |
| (Bulgaria) (Finland) (Italy) (Romania) 2026 | Banned by FIVB | | | | | | | |
| (Montenegro) 2028 | To be determined | | | | | | | |
| Total | 14 Titles | 30/34 | 221 | 188 | 33 | 601 | 193 | — |

=== European League ===
- 2004 – (silver) Silver medal
- 2005 – (gold) Gold medal

== Team ==
=== 2026 ===
The following was the Russian roster in the Ufa Friendlies in the city of Ufa, Russia.

Head coach: Konstantin Bryanskiy

| No. | Name | Date of birth | Height | Weight | Spike | Block | 2026 club |
|---|---|---|---|---|---|---|---|
| 1 | Pavel Pankov (C) | 14 August 1995 | 1.98 m (6 ft 6 in) | 90 kg (200 lb) | 345 cm (136 in) | 330 cm (130 in) | (Russia) Dinamo Moscow |
| 3 | Roman Poroshin | 28 June 1995 | 1.96 m (6 ft 5 in) | 94 kg (207 lb) | 332 cm (131 in) | 324 cm (128 in) | (Russia) Belogorie Belgorod |
| 22 | Denis Bogdan | 13 October 1996 | 2.00 m (6 ft 7 in) | 92 kg (203 lb) | 350 cm (140 in) | 340 cm (130 in) | (Russia) Dynamo Moscow |
| 17 | Dmitry Volkov | 25 March 1996 | 2.05 m (6 ft 9 in) | 88 kg (194 lb) | 351 cm (138 in) | 338 cm (133 in) | (Russia) Dynamo Moscow |
| 18 | Anton Semyshev | 22 August 1997 | 2.04 m (6 ft 8 in) | 90 kg (200 lb) | 350 cm (140 in) | 340 cm (130 in) | (Russia) Dynamo Moscow |
| 21 | Omar Kurbanov | 23 February 2001 | 1.95 m (6 ft 5 in) | 85 kg (187 lb) | 364 cm (143 in) | 340 cm (130 in) | (Russia) Lokomotiv Novosibirsk |
| 27 | Maxim Sapozhkov | 15 November 2001 | 2.20 m (7 ft 3 in) | 107 kg (236 lb) | 355 cm (140 in) | 340 cm (130 in) | (Russia) Dynamo Moscow |
| 20 | Ilya Kazachenkov | 30 January 2001 | 2.09 m (6 ft 10 in) | 100 kg (220 lb) | 359 cm (141 in) | 340 cm (130 in) | (Russia) Lokomotiv Novosibirsk |
| 24 | Ilya Vlasov | 3 August 1995 | 2.12 m (6 ft 11 in) | 98 kg (216 lb) | 380 cm (150 in) | 340 cm (130 in) | (Russia) Dynamo Moscow |
| 14 | Dmitry Zhuk | 31 January 2000 | 2.13 m (7 ft 0 in) | 110 kg (240 lb) | 355 cm (140 in) | 360 cm (140 in) | (Russia) Dynamo Moscow |
| 10 | Dmitry Lyzik | 31 January 2000 | 2.16 m (7 ft 1 in) | 103 kg (227 lb) | 369 cm (145 in) | 340 cm (130 in) | (Russia) Lokomotiv Novosibirsk |
| 12 | Roman Romanovsky | 20 August 2002 | 2.10 m (6 ft 11 in) | | | | (Russia) Zenit Kazan |
| 31 | Evgeny Baranov | 30 June 1995 | 1.80 m (5 ft 11 in) | 70 kg (150 lb) | 300 cm (120 in) | 290 cm (110 in) | (Russia) Dynamo Moscow |
| 28 | Ilya Fedorov | 1 August 2002 | 1.91 m (6 ft 3 in) | 80 kg (180 lb) | 320 cm (130 in) | 300 cm (120 in) | (Russia) Zenit Kazan |

=== Coaches ===
- (Russia) Viacheslav Platonov (1996–1997)
- (Russia) Vyacheslav Zaytsev (1997–1997)
- (Russia) Gennadiy Shipulin (1998–2004)

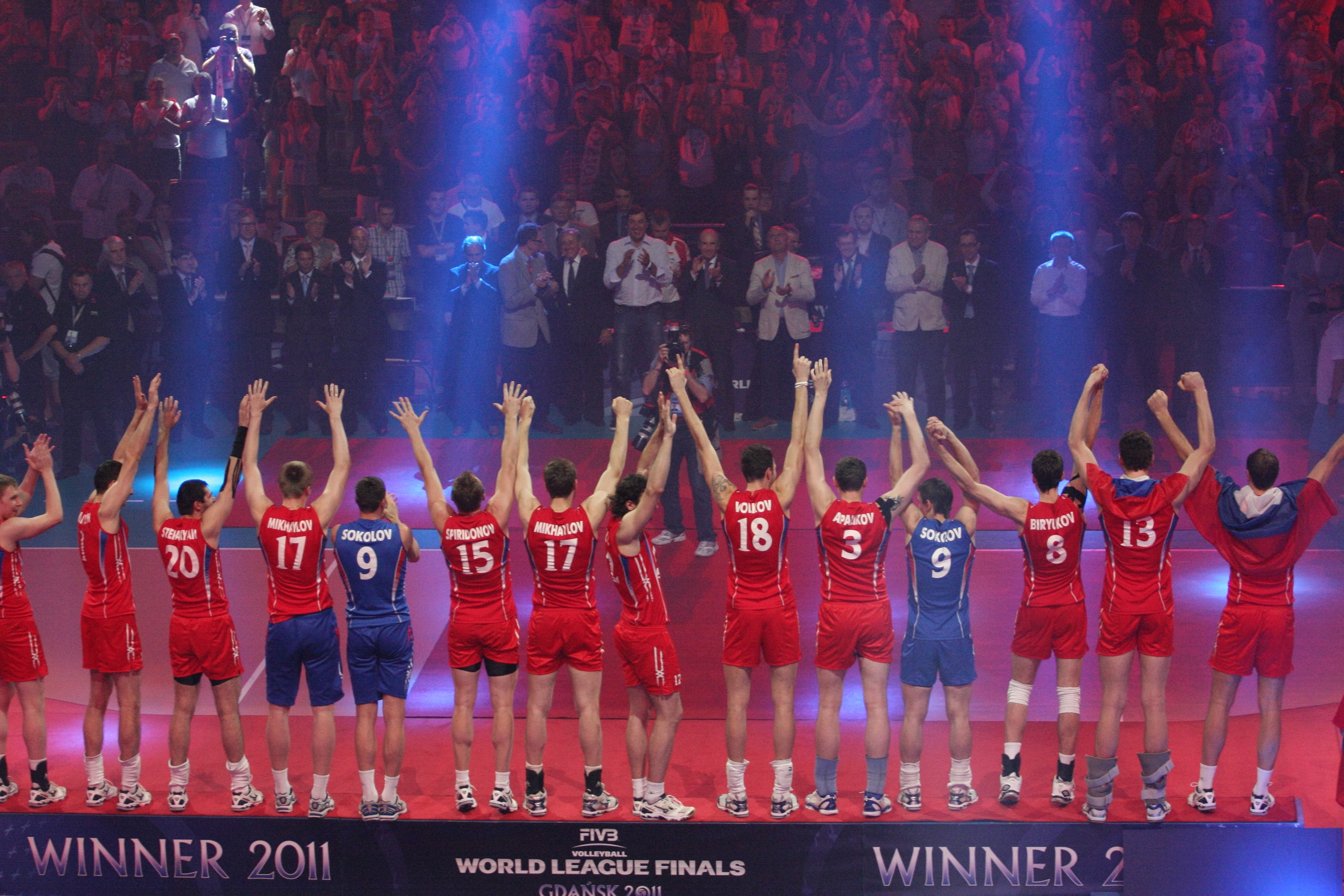
Russia team in final World League 2011

- (Serbia) Zoran Gajić (2005–2006)
- (Russia) Vladimir Alekno (2007–2008)
- (Italy) Daniele Bagnoli (2009–2010)
- (Russia) Vladimir Alekno (2011–2012)
- (Russia) Andrey Voronkov (2013–2015)
- (Russia) Vladimir Alekno (2015–2016)
- (Russia) Sergey Shlyapnikov (2017–2019)
- (Finland) Tuomas Sammelvuo (2019–2022)
- (Russia) Konstantin Bryanskiy (2022-

== Kit providers ==
The table below shows the history of kit providers for the Russia national volleyball team.

| Period | Kit provider |
|---|---|
| 2000– | Champion; Mizuno |
