= Aleksander Skiba =

Polish volleyball player and coach

Personal information
- Full name: Aleksander Andrzej Skiba
- Born: 26 February 1945; Rokitów, Poland
- Died: 6 September 2000 (aged 55); Albignasego, Italy

Coaching information
Previous teams coached
Years	Teams
1975–1979; 1979–1983; 1985–1987; 1987–1988; 1988–1990	Płomień Milowice; Poland; Santal Parma; Italy; Pallavolo Battipaglia

Career
Years	Teams
1965–1967; 1967–1975	AZS AWF Warsaw; Legia Warsaw

National team
1967–1976	Poland (210)
Honours
Men's volleyball
Representing Poland
FIVB World Championship
Gold medal – first place	1974 Mexico
CEV European Championship
Bronze medal – third place	1967 Turkey
Head coach Poland
CEV European Championship
Silver medal – second place	1979 France
Silver medal – second place	1981 Bulgaria

Aleksander Andrzej Skiba (26 February 1945 – 6 September 2000) was a Polish volleyball player and coach, a member of the Poland national team from 1967 to 1976 and the 1974 World Champion.

== Personal life ==
Skiba was born in Rokitów. After finishing his career, he lived in Italy, where he died suddenly on 6 September 2000.

== Honours ==
=== As a player ===
- Domestic
  - 1965–66 Polish Championship, with AZS AWF Warsaw
  - 1968–69 Polish Championship, with Legia Warsaw
  - 1969–70 Polish Championship, with Legia Warsaw

=== As a coach ===
- CEV European Champions Cup
  - 1977–78 – with Płomień Milowice
  - 1985–86 – with Santal Parma
- Domestic
  - 1976–77 Polish Championship, with Płomień Milowice
  - 1978–79 Polish Championship, with Płomień Milowice

Sporting positions
Preceded by (Poland) Jerzy Welcz	Head coach of Poland; 1979–1983	Succeeded by (Poland) Hubert Wagner
