= Wiesław Czaja =

Polish volleyball player and coach

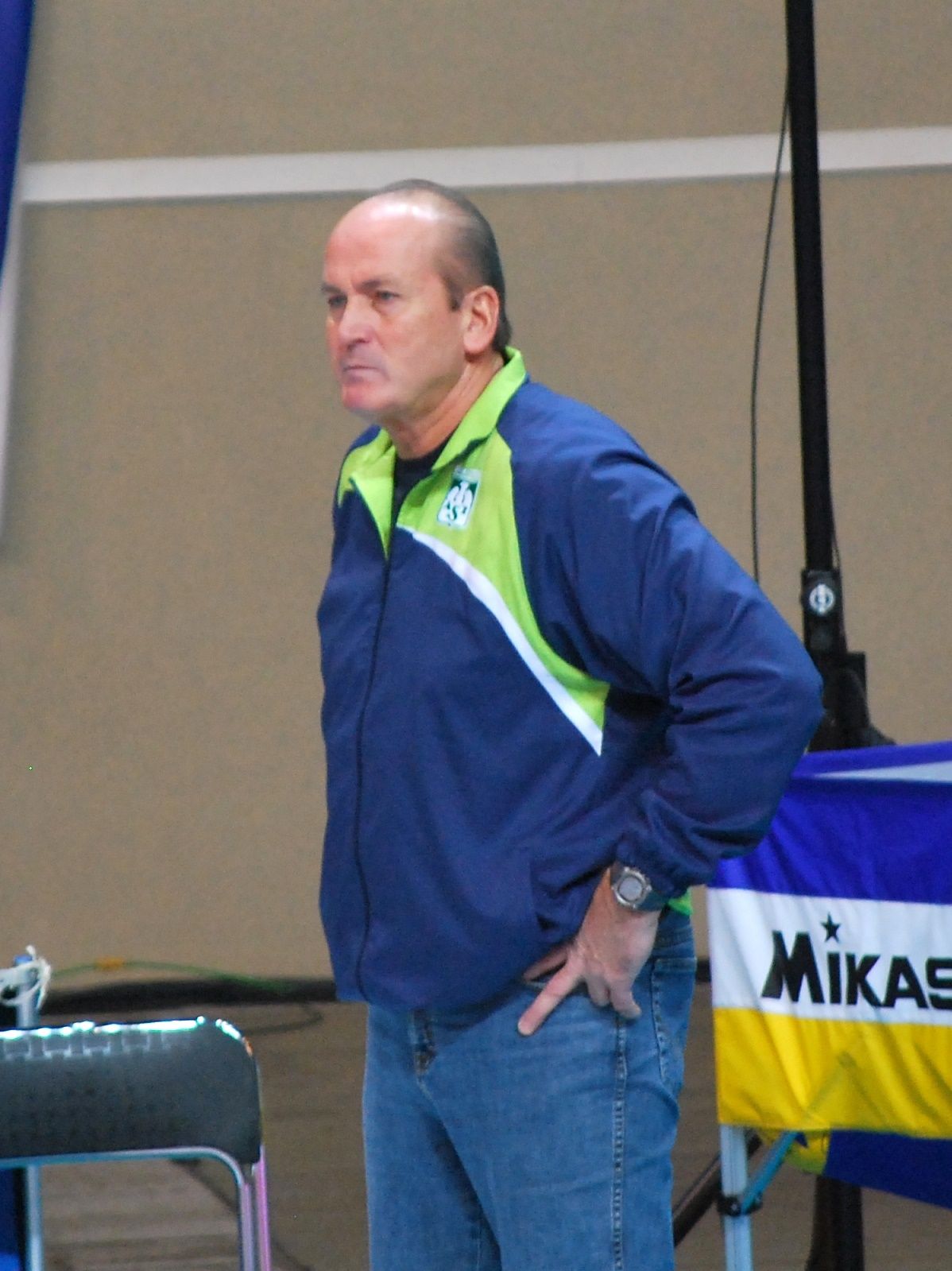

Personal information
- Born: 12 April 1952 (age 74) Czechowice-Dziedzice, Poland

Coaching information
- Previous teams coached
- Years: Teams
- 2000–2003: Skra Bełchatów

Volleyball information

Career
- Years: Team
- 1972–1975 1975–1977 1977–1982: AZS Częstochowa; Hutnik Nowa Huta; AZS Częstochowa

National team
- Years: Team
- 1974–1980: Poland (205)
Honours
Men's volleyball
Representing Poland
FIVB World Championship
Gold medal – first place	1974 Mexico
CEV European Championship
Silver medal – second place	1975 Yugoslavia
Silver medal – second place	1977 Finland
Silver medal – second place	1979 France

Wiesław Czaja (born 12 April 1952) is a Polish former volleyball player and coach, a member of the Poland national team from 1974 to 1980 and the 1974 World Champion. He competed in the 1980 Summer Olympics held in Moscow, finishing in 4th place with his national team.

== Honours ==
=== As a coach ===
- Youth national team
  - 2013 European Youth Olympic Festival
