= Edward Skorek =

Polish volleyball player and coach

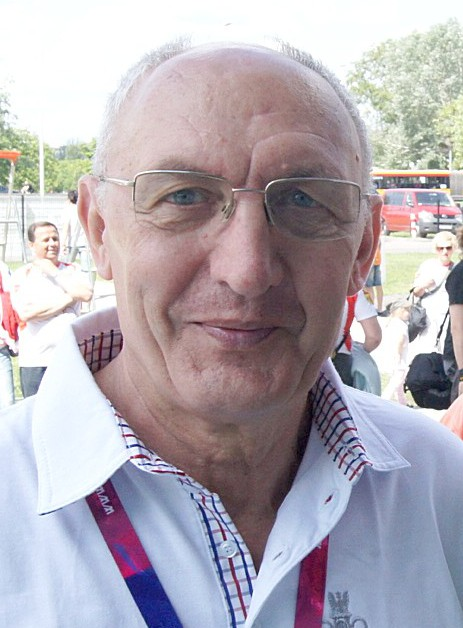

Personal information
- Nickname: Szabla
- Born: 13 June 1943 (age 83); Tomaszów Mazowiecki, Poland
- Height: 1.92 m (6 ft 4 in)

Coaching information
Previous teams coached
Years	Teams
1975–1978; 1978; 1978–1979; 1990–1992; 1992–1993; 1997–2000; 2001–2002; 2003–2006	Modena Volley; Italy; Pallavolo Loreto; Poland; AZS Częstochowa; Czarni Radom; Kuwait; AZS Częstochowa

Volleyball information
- Number: 4 (national team)

Career
Years	Teams
1961–1963; 1963–1967; 1967–1975; 1975–1977	Lechia Tomaszów Mazowiecki; AZS AWF Warsaw; Legia Warsaw; Panini Modena

National team
1964–1976	Poland (284)
Honours
Men's volleyball
Representing Poland
Olympic Games
Gold medal – first place	1976 Montreal
FIVB World Championship
Gold medal – first place	1974 Mexico
FIVB World Cup
Silver medal – second place	1965 Poland
CEV European Championship
Bronze medal – third place	1967 Turkey

Edward Skorek (born 13 June 1943) is a Polish former volleyball player and coach. As a member of the Poland national team, he won gold medals at the 1976 Summer Olympics and the 1974 World Championship. Skorek was inducted into the International Volleyball Hall of Fame in 2006.

== Honours ==
=== As a player ===
- Domestic
  - 1964–65 Polish Championship, with AZS AWF Warsaw
  - 1965–66 Polish Championship, with AZS AWF Warsaw
  - 1968–69 Polish Championship, with Legia Warsaw
  - 1969–70 Polish Championship, with Legia Warsaw
  - 1975–76 Italian Championship, with Panini Modena

=== As a coach ===
- Domestic
  - 1975–76 Italian Championship, with Panini Modena
  - 1992–93 Polish Championship, with AZS Yawal Częstochowa
  - 1998–99 Polish Cup, with Czarni Radom

=== State awards ===
- 1998: Officer's Cross of Polonia Restituta

Sporting positions
Preceded by (Poland) Leszek Milewski	Head coach of Poland; 1990–1992	Succeeded by (Poland) Zbigniew Zarzycki
