= Mirosław Rybaczewski =

Polish volleyball player

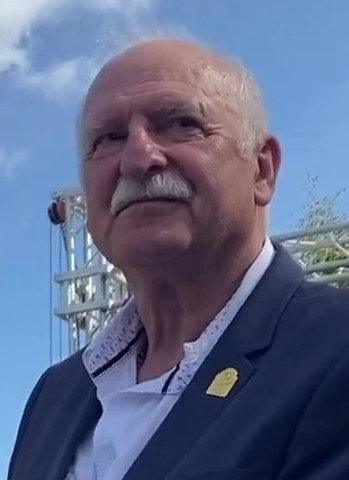
- Rybaczewski in 2021

Personal information
- Born: 8 July 1952 (age 74); Warsaw, Poland

Coaching information
Previous teams coached
Years	Teams
1986–1988	Legia Warsaw

Career
Years	Teams
1972–1982; 1982–1986	AZS Olsztyn; US Mulhouse

National team
1973–1980	Poland (167)
Honours
Men's volleyball
Representing Poland
Olympic Games
Gold medal – first place	1976 Montreal
FIVB World Championship
Gold medal – first place	1974 Mexico
CEV European Championship
Silver medal – second place	1975 Yugoslavia

Mirosław Rybaczewski (born 8 July 1952) is a Polish former volleyball player, a member of the Poland national team from 1973 to 1980. During his career, he won the titles of the 1976 Olympic Champion and the 1974 World Champion.

== Personal life ==
His daughter, Anna was also a volleyball player.

== Honours ==
=== Club ===
- CEV Cup
  - 1977–78 – with AZS Olsztyn
- Domestic
  - 1972–73 Polish Championship, with AZS Olsztyn
  - 1975–76 Polish Championship, with AZS Olsztyn
  - 1977–78 Polish Championship, with AZS Olsztyn
  - 1981–82 Polish Cup, with AZS Olsztyn

=== Youth national team ===
- 1971 CEV U20 European Championship
