= Volleyball at the 1976 Summer Olympics – Men's tournament =

Men's volleyball at the Games of the XXI Olympiad
- Venue: Montreal Forum and Paul Sauvé Arena
- Date: 18–30 July

Medalists
1st place, gold medalist(s)		Poland (1st title)
2nd place, silver medalist(s)		Soviet Union
3rd place, bronze medalist(s)		Cuba

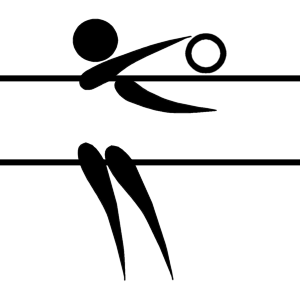

The men's tournament in volleyball at the 1976 Summer Olympics was the 4th edition of the event at the Summer Olympics, organized by the world's governing body, the FIVB in conjunction with the IOC. It was held in Montreal, Canada from 18 to 30 July 1976.

== Qualification ==
Means of qualification	Date	Host	Vacancies	Qualified
Host Country	12 May 1970	(Netherlands) Amsterdam	1	Canada
1972 Olympic Games	27 August – 9 September 1972	(West Germany) Munich	1	Japan
1974 World Championship	12–28 October 1974	Mexico	1	Poland
1976 African Championship	1976	(Tunisia) Tunis	1	Egypt
1975 Asian Championsnip	17–28 August 1975	(Australia) Melbourne	1	South Korea
1975 European Championship	18–25 October 1975	Yugoslavia	1	Soviet Union
1975 NORCECA Championship	3–8 August 1975	(United States) Los Angeles	1	Cuba
1975 South American Championship	26 November – 3 December 1975	(Paraguay) Asunción	1	Brazil
World Qualifier	15–23 January 1976	Italy	2	Czechoslovakia
World Qualifier	15–23 January 1976	Italy	2	Italy
Total			10	

== Pools composition ==
Pool A	Pool B
Canada (Hosts)	Soviet Union
Czechoslovakia	Italy
Poland	Brazil
South Korea	Japan
Cuba	Egypt

== Venues ==
Main venue	Sub venue
Montreal, Canada	Montreal, Canada
Montreal Forum	Paul Sauvé Arena
Capacity: 18,575	Capacity: 4,000
	No Image

== Preliminary round ==
=== Pool A ===
Pos	Team	Pld	W	L	Pts	SW	SL	SR	SPW	SPL	SPR	Qualification
1	Poland	4	4	0	8	12	5	2.400	235	172	1.366	Semifinals
2	Cuba	4	3	1	7	11	4	2.750	208	142	1.465	Semifinals
3	Czechoslovakia	4	2	2	6	8	7	1.143	182	177	1.028	5th–8th semifinals
4	South Korea	4	1	3	5	6	9	0.667	146	187	0.781	5th–8th semifinals
5	Canada	4	0	4	4	0	12	0.000	88	181	0.486	

Date		Score		Set 1	Set 2	Set 3	Set 4	Set 5	Total
18 Jul	Czechoslovakia	3–0	Canada	15–4	16–14	15–11			46–29
18 Jul	Poland	3–2	South Korea	12–15	6–15	15–6	15–6	15–5	63–47
19 Jul	Poland	3–0	Canada	15–4	15–7	15–6			45–17
19 Jul	Cuba	3–1	Czechoslovakia	15–6	10–15	15–5	15–6		55–32
21 Jul	Poland	3–2	Cuba	13–15	10–15	15–6	15–9	20–18	73–63
21 Jul	South Korea	3–0	Canada	15–7	15–5	15–8			45–20
23 Jul	Cuba	3–0	South Korea	15–4	15–5	15–6			45–15
23 Jul	Poland	3–1	Czechoslovakia	8–15	15–11	15–5	16–14		54–45
25 Jul	Czechoslovakia	3–1	South Korea	15–9	15–9	14–16	15–5		59–39
25 Jul	Cuba	3–0	Canada	15–10	15–9	15–3			45–22

=== Pool B ===
Pos	Team	Pld	W	L	Pts	SW	SL	SR	SPW	SPL	SPR	Qualification
1	Soviet Union	3	3	0	6	9	0	MAX	135	63	2.143	Semifinals
2	Japan	3	2	1	5	6	3	2.000	118	89	1.326	Semifinals
3	Brazil	3	1	2	4	3	8	0.375	118	142	0.831	5th–8th semifinals
4	Italy	3	0	3	3	2	9	0.222	81	158	0.513	5th–8th semifinals
WD	Egypt (Note: Egypt withdrew because of the Congolese-led boycott after they lost to Brazil 1–3 (5–15, 5–15, 15–13, 9–15) on 18 July. The result of that match was annulled.)	0	0	0	0	0	0	—	0	0	—	

Notes:

Date		Score		Set 1	Set 2	Set 3	Set 4	Set 5	Total
18 Jul	Soviet Union	3–0	Italy	15–6	15–3	15–6			45–15
20 Jul	Soviet Union	3–0	Brazil	15–7	15–11	15–2			45–20
20 Jul	Japan	3–0	Italy	15–6	15–2	15–6			45–14
22 Jul	Japan	3–0	Brazil	15–13	15–8	15–9			45–30
24 Jul	Brazil	3–2	Italy	15–8	11–15	12–15	15–6	15–8	68–52
25 Jul	Soviet Union	3–0	Japan	15–9	15–10	15–9			45–28

== Final round ==
=== 5th–8th places ===
5th–8th semifinals
26 July
Czechoslovakia	3
Italy	0
26 July
South Korea	3
Brazil	2

5th place match
27 July
Czechoslovakia	3
South Korea	1
7th place match
27 July
Italy	0
Brazil	3

==== 5th–8th semifinals ====
Date		Score		Set 1	Set 2	Set 3	Set 4	Set 5	Total
26 Jul	South Korea	3–2	Brazil	15–12	12–15	7–15	15–6	15–5	64–53
26 Jul	Czechoslovakia	3–0	Italy	15–7	15–8	15–7			45–22

==== 7th place match ====
Date		Score		Set 1	Set 2	Set 3	Set 4	Set 5	Total
27 Jul	Italy	0–3	Brazil	8–15	6–15	8–15			22–45

==== 5th place match ====
Date		Score		Set 1	Set 2	Set 3	Set 4	Set 5	Total
27 Jul	Czechoslovakia	3–1	South Korea	15–9	10–15	15–2	15–9		55–35

=== Final four ===
Semifinals
29 July
Poland	3
Japan	2
29 July
Cuba	0
Soviet Union	3

Gold medal match
30 July
Poland	3
Soviet Union	2
Bronze medal match
30 July
Japan	0
Cuba	3

==== Semifinals ====
Date		Score		Set 1	Set 2	Set 3	Set 4	Set 5	Total
29 Jul	Cuba	0–3	Soviet Union	12–15	7–15	8–15			27–45
29 Jul	Poland	3–2	Japan	15–17	15–6	15–6	10–15	15–10	70–54

==== Bronze medal match ====
Date		Score		Set 1	Set 2	Set 3	Set 4	Set 5	Total
30 Jul	Japan	0–3	Cuba	8–15	9–15	8–15			25–45

==== Gold medal match ====
Date		Score		Set 1	Set 2	Set 3	Set 4	Set 5	Total
30 Jul	Poland	3–2	Soviet Union	11–15	15–13	12–15	19–17	15–7	72–67

== Final standing ==
Rank	Team
1st place, gold medalist(s)	Poland
2nd place, silver medalist(s)	Soviet Union
3rd place, bronze medalist(s)	Cuba
4	Japan
5	Czechoslovakia
6	South Korea
7	Brazil
8	Italy
9	Canada
WD	Egypt

1976 Men's Olympic champions

Poland
1st title

12–man Roster
Włodzimierz Stefański, Bronisław Bebel, Lech Łasko, Edward Skorek, Tomasz Wójtowicz, Wiesław Gawłowski, Mirosław Rybaczewski, Zbigniew Lubiejewski, Ryszard Bosek, Włodzimierz Sadalski, Zbigniew Zarzycki, Marek Karbarz
Head coach
Hubert Wagner

== Medalists ==
Gold	Silver	Bronze
Poland Włodzimierz Stefański; Bronisław Bebel; Lech Łasko; Edward Skorek; Tomasz Wójtowicz; Wiesław Gawłowski; Mirosław Rybaczewski; Zbigniew Lubiejewski; Ryszard Bosek; Włodzimierz Sadalski; Zbigniew Zarzycki; Marek Karbarz Head coach: Hubert Wagner	Soviet Union Anatoliy Polishchuk; Vyacheslav Zaytsev; Yefim Chulak; Vladimir Dorokhov; Aleksandr Ermilov; Pāvels Seļivanovs; Oleg Moliboga; Vladimir Kondra; Yuri Starunsky; Vladimir Chernyshov; Vladimir Ulanov; Aleksandr Savin Head coach: Yuri Chesnokov	Cuba Leonel Marshall; Victoriano Sarmientos; Ernesto Martínez; Víctor García; Carlos Salas; Raúl Vilches; Jesús Savigne; Lorenzo Martínez; Diego Lapera; Antonio Rodríguez; Alfredo Figueredo; Jorge Pérez Vento Head coach: Idolo Gilberto Herrera
