= Włodzimierz Sadalski =

Polish volleyball player and coach

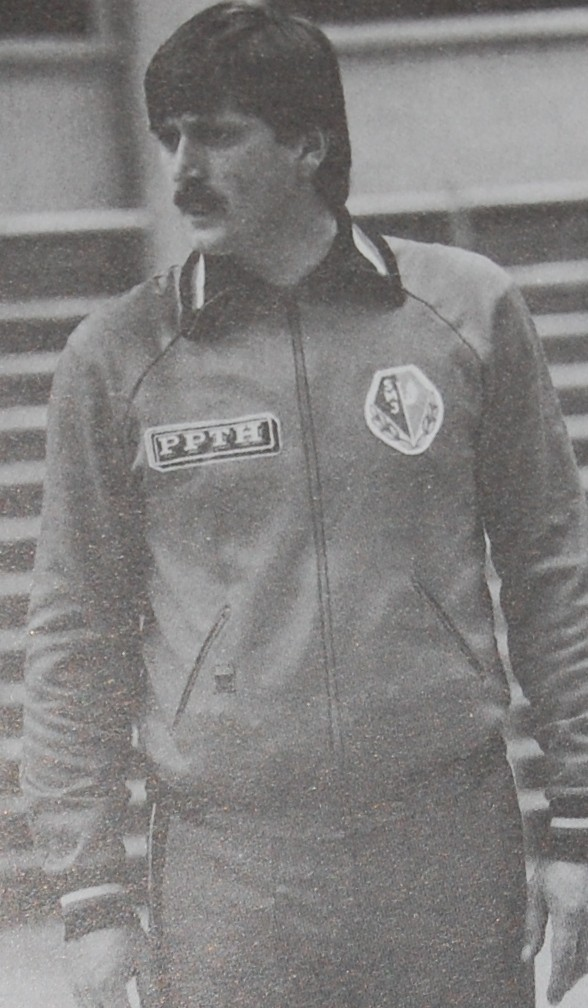

Personal information
- Born: 29 August 1949 (age 77) Poznań, Poland
- Height: 192 cm (6 ft 4 in)

Coaching information
- Previous teams coached
- Years: Teams
- 1987–1992: Finland

Volleyball information

Career
- Years: Team
- 1966–1974 1974–1979: Skra Warsaw; Płomień Milowice; Tiikerit Kokkola; Ylivieskan Kuula

National team
- Years: Team
- 1970–1977: Poland (186)
Honours
Men's volleyball
Representing Poland
Olympic Games
Gold medal – first place	1976 Montreal
FIVB World Championship
Gold medal – first place	1974 Mexico
CEV European Championship
Silver medal – second place	1975 Yugoslavia
Silver medal – second place	1977 Finland

Włodzimierz Sadalski (born 29 August 1949) is a Polish former volleyball player and coach who was a member of the Poland national team from 1970 to 1977. During his career, he won gold medals at the 1974 FIVB World Championship and the 1976 Summer Olympics.

== Honours ==
=== As a player ===
- CEV European Champions Cup
  - 1977–78 – with Płomień Milowice
- Domestic
  - 1976–77 Polish Championship, with Płomień Milowice
  - 1978–79 Polish Championship, with Płomień Milowice
