= Lech Łasko =

Polish volleyball player (born 1956)

Personal information
- Born: 2 June 1956 (age 70); Świdnik, Poland

Career
| Years | Teams |
|---|---|
| 1974–1977; 1977–1985; 1985–1987 | Avia Świdnik; Gwardia Wrocław; Di.Po.Vimercate |

National team
| 1975–1984 | Poland (261) |
Honours
Men's volleyball
Representing Poland
Olympic Games
| Gold medal – first place | 1976 Montreal |
CEV European Championship
| Silver medal – second place | 1975 Yugoslavia |
| Silver medal – second place | 1979 France |
| Silver medal – second place | 1981 Bulgaria |
| Silver medal – second place | 1983 Germany |

Lech Łasko (born 2 June 1956) is a Polish former volleyball player, a member of the Poland national team from 1975 to 1984. He won a gold medal in the men's tournament at the Olympic Games Montreal 1976.

== Personal life ==
His son, Michał was also a volleyball player.

== Honours ==
=== Club ===
- Domestic
  - 1979–80 Polish Championship, with Gwardia Wrocław
  - 1980–81 Polish Cup, with Gwardia Wrocław
  - 1980–81 Polish Championship, with Gwardia Wrocław
  - 1981–82 Polish Championship, with Gwardia Wrocław
