= Zbigniew Lubiejewski =

Polish volleyball player and coach

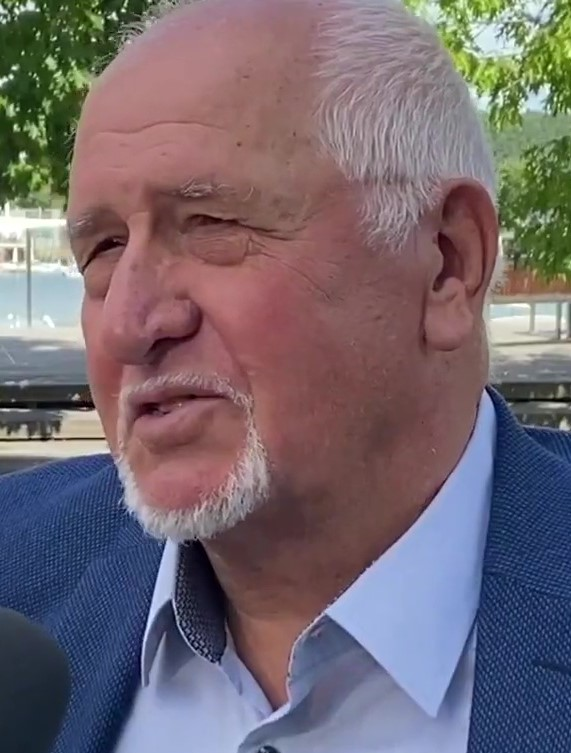
- Lubiejewski in 2021

Personal information
- Born: 6 November 1949 (age 76) Bartoszyce, Poland

Coaching information
- Previous teams coached
- Years: Teams
- 1986–1987: Noliko Maaseik

Volleyball information

Career
- Years: Team
- 1969–1978: AZS Olsztyn

National team
- Years: Team
- 1972–1977: Poland (74)
Honours
Men's volleyball
Representing Poland
Olympic Games
Gold medal – first place	1976 Montreal
CEV European Championship
Silver medal – second place	1975 Yugoslavia

Zbigniew Lubiejewski (born 6 November 1949) is a Polish former volleyball player and coach, a member of the Poland national team from 1972 to 1977 and the 1976 Olympic Champion.

== Honours ==
=== Club ===
- CEV Cup
  - 1977–78 – with AZS Olsztyn
- Domestic
  - 1969–70 Polish Cup, with AZS Olsztyn
  - 1970–71 Polish Cup, with AZS Olsztyn
  - 1971–72 Polish Cup, with AZS Olsztyn
  - 1972–73 Polish Championship, with AZS Olsztyn
  - 1975–76 Polish Championship, with AZS Olsztyn
  - 1977–78 Polish Championship, with AZS Olsztyn
