= Viljar Loor =

Estonian volleyball player (1953–2011)

Personal information
- Born: October 1, 1953 Tartu, then part of Estonian SSR, Soviet Union
- Died: March 22, 2011 (aged 57) Tallinn, Estonia
- Height: 196 cm (6 ft 5 in)

Volleyball information
- Position: Middle blocker
- Number: 12

National team
- Years: Team
- 1975–1983: Soviet Union
Honours
Men's volleyball
Representing Soviet Union
Olympic Games
Gold medal – first place	1980 Moscow	Team
World Championship
Gold medal – first place	1978 Italy
Gold medal – first place	1982 Argentina
World Cup
Gold medal – first place	1977 Japan
Gold medal – first place	1981 Japan
European Championship
Gold medal – first place	1975 Yugoslavia
Gold medal – first place	1977 Finland
Gold medal – first place	1979 France
Gold medal – first place	1981 Bulgaria
Gold medal – first place	1983 East Germany
European Junior Championship
Gold medal – first place	1971 Spain	Under-20
Gold medal – first place	1973 Netherlands	Under-20

Viljar Loor (1 October 1953 – 22 March 2011) was among the most accomplished Estonian volleyball players. At the 1980 Summer Olympics in Moscow, Loor won the gold medal with the Soviet Union men's national volleyball team. He also won gold medals with the Soviet team at the 1978 FIVB World Championship in Italy and the 1982 FIVB World Championship in Argentina. He was a middle blocker.

== Personal life and death ==
Loor was born in Tartu. He died on 22 March 2011, in Tallinn.

== Achievements ==
- Olympic winner: 1980
- World Champion: 1978, 1982
- European Champion: 1975, 1977, 1979, 1981, 1983
- World Cup winner: 1977, 1981
- European Youth Champion: 1971, 1973
- 4 × European Club Champions Cup winner
- 8 × Soviet Champion
