= Vladimir Chernyshyov =

Russian volleyball player

Vladimir Chernyshov
Personal information
- Born: June 21, 1951 Pochinok, Smolensk Oblast, Russian SFSR, Soviet Union
- Died: May 1, 2004 (aged 52) Licciana Nardi, Italy
- Height: 1.93 m (6 ft 4 in)

Volleyball information
- Position: Outside hitter
- Number: 10 (1976); 9 (1980)

National team
- Years: Team
- 1970–1981: Soviet Union
Honours
Men's volleyball
Representing Soviet Union
Olympic Games
Gold medal – first place	1980 Moscow	Team
Silver medal – second place	1976 Montreal	Team
World Championship
Gold medal – first place	1978 Italy
Silver medal – second place	1974 Mexico
World Cup
Gold medal – first place	1977 Japan
European Championship
Gold medal – first place	1975 Yugoslavia
Gold medal – first place	1977 Finland
Gold medal – first place	1979 France
Gold medal – first place	1981 Bulgaria
Universiade
Gold medal – first place	1970 Turin
Gold medal – first place	1973 Moscow
European Junior Championship
Gold medal – first place	1969 Soviet Union	Under-20
Gold medal – first place	1971 Spain	Under-20

Vladimir Dmitrievich Chernyshov (Russian: Владимир Дмитриевич Чернышёв, 21 June 1951 – 1 May 2004) was a Russian former volleyball player who competed for the Soviet Union in the 1976 Summer Olympics and the 1980 Summer Olympics.

Chernyshov was born in Pochinok, Smolensk Oblast and died in Licciana Nardi, Italy.

In 1976, Chernyshov was part of the Soviet team that won the silver medal in the Olympic tournament in Montreal. He played all five matches.

Four years later, Chernyshov won the gold medal with the Soviet team in the 1980 Olympic tournament in Moscow. He played five matches.
