= Zbigniew Zarzycki =

Polish volleyball player and coach

Personal information
- Born: 8 September 1946 (age 80) Lębork, Poland

Coaching information
- Previous teams coached
- Years: Teams
- 1992–1993 2000: Poland; Skra Bełchatów

Volleyball information

Career
- Years: Team
- 1968–1971 1972–1979: AZS AWF Warsaw; Płomień Milowice

National team
- Years: Team
- 1968–1976: Poland (159)
Honours
Men's volleyball
Representing Poland
Olympic Games
Gold medal – first place	1976 Montreal
FIVB World Championship
Gold medal – first place	1974 Mexico

Zbigniew Zarzycki (born 8 September 1946) is a Polish former volleyball player and coach, a member of the Poland national team from 1968 to 1976. He won a gold medal at the Olympic Games Montreal 1976 and the 1974 World Championship.

== Honours ==
=== As a player ===
- CEV European Champions Cup
  - 1977–78 – with Płomień Milowice
- Domestic
  - 1976–77 Polish Championship, with Płomień Milowice
  - 1978–79 Polish Championship, with Płomień Milowice

Sporting positions
Preceded by (Poland) Edward Skorek	Head coach of Poland; 1992–1993	Succeeded by (Poland) Ryszard Kruk
