= Marek Karbarz =

Polish volleyball player and coach

Personal information
- Born: 22 July 1950 (age 76); Charzewice, Poland

Career
Years	Teams
1968–1977; 1977–1980; 1981–1982	Resovia; Hutnik Kraków; Arago de Sète

National team
1969–1979	Poland (218)
Honours
Men's volleyball
Representing Poland
Olympic Games
Gold medal – first place	1976 Montreal
FIVB World Championship
Gold medal – first place	1974 Mexico
CEV European Championship
Silver medal – second place	1977 Finland

Marek Karbarz (born 22 July 1950) is a Polish former volleyball player and coach, a member of the Poland national team from 1969 to 1979. He is the 1976 Olympic Champion and the 1974 World Champion.

== Honours ==
=== Club ===
- CEV European Champions Cup
  - 1972–73 – with Resovia
- Domestic
  - 1970–71 Polish Championship, with Resovia
  - 1971–72 Polish Championship, with Resovia
  - 1973–74 Polish Championship, with Resovia
  - 1974–75 Polish Cup, with Resovia
  - 1974–75 Polish Championship, with Resovia
