= Michał Łasko =

Italian volleyball player

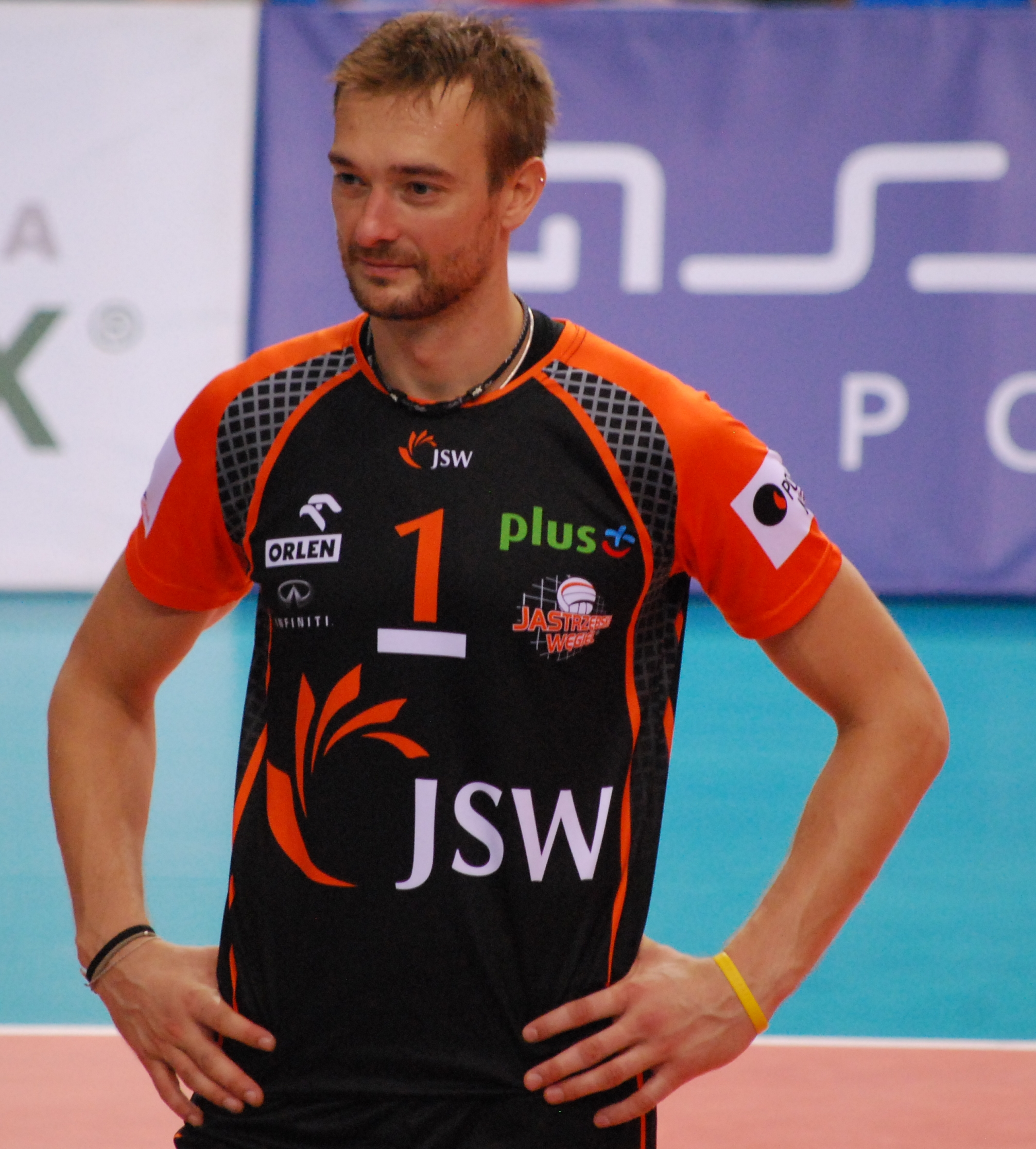

Personal information
- Full name: Michał Eryk Łasko
- Nationality: Italian
- Born: 11 March 1981 (age 45) Wrocław, Poland
- Height: 2.02 m (6 ft 8 in)

Volleyball information
- Position: Opposite

Career
- Years: Team
- 1997–2001 2001–2005 2005–2006 2006–2008 2008–2011 2011–2015 2015–2016 2016 2016–2017 2018–2019: Volley Treviso; Verona Volley; Volley Callipo; Piemonte Volley; Verona Volley; Jastrzębski Węgiel; Sichuan Chengdu; Hydra Latina; Ural Ufa; Roma Volley

National team
- Years: Team
- 2005–: Italy
Honours
Men's volleyball
Representing Italy
Olympic Games
Bronze medal – third place	2012 London
FIVB World Grand Champions Cup
Bronze medal – third place	2005 Japan
CEV European Championship
Gold medal – first place	2005 Italy/Serbia
Silver medal – second place	2011 Austria/Czech Republic

Michał Eryk Łasko (born 11 March 1981) is an Italian former volleyball player of Polish descent, member of the Italy men's national volleyball team, bronze medallist at the Olympic Games (London 2012), 2005 European Champion, 2001 Italian Champion.

== Personal life ==
Michał Łasko was born in Wrocław, Poland, but raised in Italy. His father, Lech Łasko, is a former Polish volleyball player - 1976 Olympic Champion. He plays for the Italian national team, because he was raised in Italy and he has never received an offer to play for Poland. He speaks the Polish language very well. On 17 June 2013 he married Milena Stacchiotti, an Italian volleyball player. On 8 October 2014 his wife gave birth to their first child, a daughter named Nicole. On 30 August 2016 their second daughter Asia was born.

== Career ==
=== Club ===
Michał lived in Italy since his childhood and started playing for Sisley Treviso's youth team. He debuted in Serie A1 in 2001 with Treviso, after moving to Verona, where he remained for four years, playing in A1 and A2. After a year at Vibo Valentia, he was signed by BreBanca Lannutti Cuneo in 2006. In 2008, together with Simone Parodi, he moved to Blu Volley Verona. Łasko is currently playing for Jastrzębski Węgiel in the Polish volleyball league, PlusLiga. On 19 June 2015 he announced that he had moved to Chinese team Sichuan Chengdu, together with Zbigniew Bartman - one of his teammates from previous club.

=== National team ===
With Italy, he won a title of the European Champion 2005, a silver medal at the European Championship 2011 and a bronze medal at the Olympic Games 2012.

== Honours ==
=== Club ===
- CEV European Champions Cup
  - 1999–2000 – with Sisley Treviso
- FIVB Club World Championship
  - Doha 2011 – with Jastrzębski Węgiel
- Domestic
  - 1999–2000 Italian Cup, with Sisley Treviso
  - 1999–2000 Italian SuperCup, with Sisley Treviso
  - 2000–01 Italian Championship, with Sisley Treviso

=== Individual awards ===
- 2012: Polish Cup – Best spiker
- 2014: CEV Champions League – Best scorer

=== Statistics ===
- 2011–12 PlusLiga – Best spiker (463 points)
