= Sadalski =

Sadalski or Sadalsky is a Polish masculine surname, its feminine counterpart is Sadalska or Sadalskaya. The surname may refer to

- Karolina Sadalska (born 1981), Polish sprint canoer
- Stanislav Sadalsky (born 1951), Russian actor
- Włodzimierz Sadalski (born 1949), Polish volleyball player
