= Dorokhov =

Dorokhov (Russian: Дорохов) is a Slavic masculine surname, its feminine counterpart is Dorokhova. Notable people with the surname include:

- Vladimir Dorokhov (1954–2024), Russian volleyball player
- Tetyana Dorokhova (born 1985), Ukrainian archer
