= Vladimir Dorokhov =

Russian volleyball player (1954–2024)

Personal information
- Full name: Vladimir Vyacheslavovich Dorokhov
- Born: 18 February 1954 Leningrad, Russian SFSR, Soviet Union
- Died: 18 December 2024 (aged 70)
- Height: 1.94 m (6 ft 4 in)

Volleyball information
- Position: Outside hitter
- Number: 4

National team
- Years: Team
- 1975-1982: Soviet Union
Honours
Men's volleyball
Representing Soviet Union
Olympic Games
Gold medal – first place	1980 Moscow	Team
Silver medal – second place	1976 Montreal	Team
World Championship
Gold medal – first place	1978 Italy
Gold medal – first place	1982 Argentina
World Cup
Gold medal – first place	1977 Japan
Gold medal – first place	1981 Japan
European Championship
Gold medal – first place	1975 Yugoslavia
Gold medal – first place	1977 Finland
Gold medal – first place	1979 France
Gold medal – first place	1981 Bulgaria
European Junior Championship
Gold medal – first place	1973 Netherlands	Under-20

Vladimir Vyacheslavovich Dorokhov (Russian: Владимир Вячеславович Дорохов; 18 February 1954 – 18 December 2024) was a Russian volleyball player who competed for the Soviet Union in the 1976 Summer Olympics in Montreal and the 1980 Summer Olympics in Moscow.

== Biography ==
Dorokhov was born in Leningrad on 18 February 1954.

In 1976, Dorokhov was part of the Soviet team which won the silver medal in the Olympic tournament. He played all five matches.

Four years later, Dorokhov won the gold medal with the Soviet team in the 1980 Olympic tournament. He played all six matches.

Dorokhov died on 18 December 2024, at the age of 70.
