= Viacheslav Platonov =

Russian volleyball player and coach

Personal information
- Full name: Vyacheslav Alekseyevich Platonov
- Born: 21 February 1939; St. Petersburg, Russia
- Died: 26 December 2005 (aged 66); St. Petersburg, Russia

Coaching information
Previous teams coached
| Years | Teams |
|---|---|
| 1977–1985, 1990–1991; 1992; 1995–1997 | Soviet Union; CIS; Russia |

Viacheslav Platonov (Russian: Вячеслав Платонов; 21 January 1939 – 26 December 2005) was a Russian volleyball player and coach. He led the Soviet men's national volleyball team to gold medals at the 1978 FIVB World Championship in Italy, 1982 FIVB World Championship in Argentina, and the 1980 Summer Olympics in Moscow.

== Club volleyball ==
Platonov played volleyball for the Russian club teams SKIF, SKA, and Spartak from 1954 to 1967.

== Coaching ==
Platonov coached the Soviet men's team from 1977 to 1985, and again from 1990 to 1991. He coached the same team, referred to as the Unified Team, in 1992. He then coached the Russian men's team from 1995 to 1997.

Platonov coached several clubs, notably Automobilist Leningrad, leading them to USSR Championship titles in 1983 and 1989.

For his extraordinary achievements as a coach, Platonov was inducted into the International Volleyball Hall of Fame in 2002.

== Personal life ==
Platonov's father was killed during World War II in Kharkiv, Ukraine.
