= Dmitry Volkov =

Dmitry Volkov may refer to:

- Dmitry Volkov (physicist) (1925–1996), physicist at Kharkiv Institute of Physics and Technology in Ukraine
- Dmitry Volkov (statesman) (1718–1785), Russian senator (1768–1782), governor of Saint Petersburg Governorate 1779–1780
- Dmitry Volkov (swimmer) (1966–2025), swimmer from Russia
- Dmitry Volkov (volleyball) (born 1995), Russian volleyball player
- Dmitry Volkov (entrepreneur) (born 1976), entrepreneur, investor, philosopher, member of the contemporary art scene
