= 1974 FIVB Men's Volleyball World Championship =

1974 FIVB World Championship
Tournament details
- Host country: Mexico
- Dates: 12–28 October
- Teams: 24
- Venues: 6 (in 6 host cities)
- Officially opened by: Luis Echeverría

Final positions
- Champions: Poland (1st title)

The 1974 FIVB Men's World Championship was the eighth edition of the tournament, organised by the world's governing body, the FIVB. It was held from 12 to 28 October 1974 in Mexico.

== Qualification ==
Means of qualification	Date	Host	Vacancies	Qualified
Host Country	—N/a	—N/a	1	Mexico
1970 FIVB Men's Volleyball World Championship	29 Sep – 12 Oct 1970	Bulgaria	8	East Germany
1970 FIVB Men's Volleyball World Championship	29 Sep – 12 Oct 1970	Bulgaria	8	Bulgaria
1970 FIVB Men's Volleyball World Championship	29 Sep – 12 Oct 1970	Bulgaria	8	Japan
1970 FIVB Men's Volleyball World Championship	29 Sep – 12 Oct 1970	Bulgaria	8	Czechoslovakia
1970 FIVB Men's Volleyball World Championship	29 Sep – 12 Oct 1970	Bulgaria	8	Poland
1970 FIVB Men's Volleyball World Championship	29 Sep – 12 Oct 1970	Bulgaria	8	Soviet Union
1970 FIVB Men's Volleyball World Championship	29 Sep – 12 Oct 1970	Bulgaria	8	Romania
1970 FIVB Men's Volleyball World Championship	29 Sep – 12 Oct 1970	Bulgaria	8	Belgium
1971 Men's European Volleyball Championship	23 Sep – 1 Oct 1971	Italy	3	~~Hungary~~; France*
1971 Men's European Volleyball Championship	23 Sep – 1 Oct 1971	Italy	3	Italy
1971 Men's European Volleyball Championship	23 Sep – 1 Oct 1971	Italy	3	Netherlands
Asian Qualifier	November 1973	(Philippines) Manila	2	South Korea
Asian Qualifier	November 1973	(Philippines) Manila	2	~~Taiwan~~; China*
1973 Men's NORCECA Volleyball Championship	2–6 August 1973	(Mexico) Tijuana	6	United States
1973 Men's NORCECA Volleyball Championship	2–6 August 1973	(Mexico) Tijuana	6	Cuba
1973 Men's NORCECA Volleyball Championship	2–6 August 1973	(Mexico) Tijuana	6	Canada
1973 Men's NORCECA Volleyball Championship	2–6 August 1973	(Mexico) Tijuana	6	Puerto Rico
1973 Men's NORCECA Volleyball Championship	2–6 August 1973	(Mexico) Tijuana	6	Dominican Republic*
1973 Men's NORCECA Volleyball Championship	2–6 August 1973	(Mexico) Tijuana	6	~~Haiti~~; Panama*
1973 Men's South American Volleyball Championship	12–18 August 1973	(Colombia) Bucaramanga	2	Brazil
1973 Men's South American Volleyball Championship	12–18 August 1973	(Colombia) Bucaramanga	2	~~Argentina~~; Venezuela*
1971 Men's African Volleyball Championship	July 1971	(United Arab Republic) Cairo	2	Tunisia
1971 Men's African Volleyball Championship	July 1971	(United Arab Republic) Cairo	2	Egypt
Total			24	

* Hungary, Haiti and Argentina were replaced by France, Panama and Venezuela. Also Republic of China were replaced by People's Republic of China after FIVB recognised People's Republic of China as a legitimate Chinese state and Dominican Republic participated instead of North Korea who originally invited to the tournament.

== Venues ==
Pool A, J and Final round	Pool B, G and Final round	Pool C and K	1974 FIVB Men's Volleyball World Championship is located in Mexico
Guadalajara; Zapopan	Mexico City	Monterrey	1974 FIVB Men's Volleyball World Championship is located in Mexico
Auditorio Benito Juarez	Auditorio Nacional	Gimnasio Tecnológico	1974 FIVB Men's Volleyball World Championship is located in Mexico
Capacity: 10.000	Capacity: 10.000	Capacity: 4.000	1974 FIVB Men's Volleyball World Championship is located in Mexico
Pool D, L and Final round	Pool E, H	Pool F, I and Final round	1974 FIVB Men's Volleyball World Championship is located in Mexico
Tijuana	Puebla	Toluca	1974 FIVB Men's Volleyball World Championship is located in Mexico
Auditorio Fausto Gutierrez Moreno	Gimnasio Puebla 74	Gimnasio Juan Fernández Albarrán	1974 FIVB Men's Volleyball World Championship is located in Mexico
Capacity: 4.000	Capacity: 4.500	Capacity: 4.000	1974 FIVB Men's Volleyball World Championship is located in Mexico

== Teams ==
Group A

- Cuba
- East Germany
- Italy
- Venezuela

Group B

- Dominican Republic
- Mexico
- Netherlands
- Tunisia

Group C

- Bulgaria
- Brazil
- France
- Panama

Group D

- Belgium
- Canada
- China
- Japan

Group E

- Czechoslovakia
- South Korea
- Puerto Rico
- Romania

Group F

- Egypt
- Poland
- Soviet Union
- United States

== Results ==
=== First round ===
==== Pool A ====
Location: Guadalajara

Pos	Team	Pld	W	L	Pts	SW	SL	SR	SPW	SPL	SPR	Qualification
1	Cuba	3	3	0	6	9	1	9.000	148	90	1.644	1st–12th pools
2	East Germany	3	2	1	5	6	3	2.000	112	84	1.333	1st–12th pools
3	Italy	3	1	2	4	4	7	0.571	120	152	0.789	13th–24th pools
4	Venezuela	3	0	3	3	1	9	0.111	86	140	0.614	13th–24th pools

Date		Score		Set 1	Set 2	Set 3	Set 4	Set 5	Total
13 Oct	East Germany	3–0	Venezuela	15–2	15–3	15–7			45–12
13 Oct	Cuba	3–1	Italy	15–13	13–15	15–13	15–2		58–43
14 Oct	Cuba	3–0	Venezuela	15–12	15–3	15–10			45–25
14 Oct	East Germany	3–0	Italy	15–10	15–5	15–12			45–27
15 Oct	Italy	3–1	Venezuela	15–13	15–12	5–15	15–9		50–49
15 Oct	Cuba	3–0	East Germany	15–8	15–8	15–6			45–22

==== Pool B ====
Location: Mexico City

Pos	Team	Pld	W	L	Pts	SW	SL	SR	SPW	SPL	SPR	Qualification
1	Mexico	3	3	0	6	9	1	9.000	144	60	2.400	1st–12th pools
2	Netherlands	3	2	1	5	7	4	1.750	133	103	1.291	1st–12th pools
3	Tunisia	3	1	2	4	3	8	0.375	91	131	0.695	13th–24th pools
4	Dominican Republic	3	0	3	3	3	9	0.333	91	165	0.552	13th–24th pools

Date		Score		Set 1	Set 2	Set 3	Set 4	Set 5	Total
12 Oct	Mexico	3–0	Dominican Republic	15–2	15–2	15–10			45–14
13 Oct	Netherlands	3–0	Tunisia	15–2	15–5	15–6			45–13
14 Oct	Netherlands	3–1	Dominican Republic	15–8	13–15	15–6	15–7		58–36
14 Oct	Mexico	3–0	Tunisia	15–5	15–7	15–4			45–16
15 Oct	Tunisia	3–2	Dominican Republic	7–15	10–15	15–2	15–4	15–5	62–41
15 Oct	Mexico	3–1	Netherlands	9–15	15–3	15–4	15–8		54–30

==== Pool C ====
Location: Monterrey

Pos	Team	Pld	W	L	Pts	SW	SL	SR	SPW	SPL	SPR	Qualification
1	Bulgaria	3	3	0	6	9	3	3.000	170	106	1.604	1st–12th pools
2	Brazil	3	2	1	5	8	3	2.667	157	110	1.427	1st–12th pools
3	France	3	1	2	4	4	6	0.667	106	121	0.876	13th–24th pools
4	Panama	3	0	3	3	0	9	0.000	39	135	0.289	13th–24th pools

Date		Score		Set 1	Set 2	Set 3	Set 4	Set 5	Total
13 Oct	Bulgaria	3–0	Panama	15–0	15–1	15–2			45–3
13 Oct	Brazil	3–0	France	15–5	15–10	15–10			45–25
14 Oct	Brazil	3–0	Panama	15–4	15–6	15–8			45–18
14 Oct	Bulgaria	3–1	France	15–5	13–15	15–4	15–12		58–36
15 Oct	France	3–0	Panama	15–0	15–9	15–9			45–18
15 Oct	Bulgaria	3–2	Brazil	12–15	10–15	15–12	15–12	15–13	67–67

==== Pool D ====
Location: Tijuana

Pos	Team	Pld	W	L	Pts	SW	SL	SR	SPW	SPL	SPR	Qualification
1	Japan	3	3	0	6	9	0	MAX	135	56	2.411	1st–12th pools
2	Belgium	3	2	1	5	6	4	1.500	125	110	1.136	1st–12th pools
3	China	3	1	2	4	4	6	0.667	104	122	0.852	13th–24th pools
4	Canada	3	0	3	3	0	9	0.000	59	135	0.437	13th–24th pools

Date		Score		Set 1	Set 2	Set 3	Set 4	Set 5	Total
13 Oct	Belgium	3–1	China	15–5	15–10	8–15	15–12		53–42
13 Oct	Japan	3–0	Canada	15–6	15–3	15–3			45–12
14 Oct	Belgium	3–0	Canada	15–6	15–9	15–8			45–23
14 Oct	Japan	3–0	China	15–11	15–3	15–3			45–17
15 Oct	China	3–0	Canada	15–6	15–8	15–10			45–24
15 Oct	Japan	3–0	Belgium	15–10	15–5	15–12			45–27

==== Pool E ====
Location: Puebla

Pos	Team	Pld	W	L	Pts	SW	SL	SR	SPW	SPL	SPR	Qualification
1	Czechoslovakia	3	3	0	6	9	2	4.500	158	105	1.505	1st–12th pools
2	Romania	3	2	1	5	8	3	2.667	157	106	1.481	1st–12th pools
3	South Korea	3	1	2	4	3	6	0.500	88	100	0.880	13th–24th pools
4	Puerto Rico	3	0	3	3	0	9	0.000	43	135	0.319	13th–24th pools

Date		Score		Set 1	Set 2	Set 3	Set 4	Set 5	Total
13 Oct	Romania	3–0	South Korea	15–4	15–8	15–7			45–19
13 Oct	Czechoslovakia	3–0	Puerto Rico	15–3	15–6	15–5			45–14
14 Oct	Romania	3–0	Puerto Rico	15–9	15–5	15–5			45–19
14 Oct	Czechoslovakia	3–0	South Korea	15–10	15–7	15–7			45–24
15 Oct	South Korea	3–0	Puerto Rico	15–7	15–2	15–1			45–10
16 Oct	Czechoslovakia	3–2	Romania	17–15	9–15	15–13	12–15	15–9	68–67

==== Pool F ====
Location: Toluca

Pos	Team	Pld	W	L	Pts	SW	SL	SR	SPW	SPL	SPR	Qualification
1	Poland	3	3	0	6	9	2	4.500	154	96	1.604	1st–12th pools
2	Soviet Union	3	2	1	5	7	3	2.333	131	92	1.424	1st–12th pools
3	United States	3	1	2	4	4	6	0.667	107	119	0.899	13th–24th pools
4	Egypt	3	0	3	3	0	9	0.000	50	135	0.370	13th–24th pools

Date		Score		Set 1	Set 2	Set 3	Set 4	Set 5	Total
13 Oct	Soviet Union	3–0	United States	15–6	15–2	15–13			45–21
13 Oct	Poland	3–0	Egypt	15–3	15–6	15–5			45–14
14 Oct	Poland	3–1	United States	15–10	13–15	15–10	15–6		58–41
14 Oct	Soviet Union	3–0	Egypt	15–9	15–5	15–6			45–20
15 Oct	United States	3–0	Egypt	15–9	15–3	15–4			45–16
15 Oct	Poland	3–1	Soviet Union	15–9	6–15	15–6	15–11		51–41

=== Second round ===
==== 1st–12th pools ====
===== Pool G =====
Location: Mexico City

Pos	Team	Pld	W	L	Pts	SW	SL	SR	SPW	SPL	SPR	Qualification
1	Poland	3	3	0	6	9	1	9.000	145	94	1.543	Final places
2	East Germany	3	2	1	5	6	5	1.200	128	113	1.133	Final places
3	Mexico	3	1	2	4	6	6	1.000	153	161	0.950	7th–12th places
4	Belgium	3	0	3	3	0	9	0.000	77	135	0.570	7th–12th places

Date		Score		Set 1	Set 2	Set 3	Set 4	Set 5	Total
18 Oct	Poland	3–0	East Germany	15–4	15–6	15–2			45–12
18 Oct	Mexico	3–0	Belgium	15–12	15–11	15–12			45–35
19 Oct	Poland	3–0	Belgium	15–9	15–11	15–9			45–29
19 Oct	East Germany	3–2	Mexico	14–16	15–9	12–15	15–9	15–6	71–55
20 Oct	Poland	3–1	Mexico	15–12	15–11	8–15	17–15		55–53
20 Oct	East Germany	3–0	Belgium	15–1	15–4	15–8			45–13

===== Pool H =====
Location: Puebla

Pos	Team	Pld	W	L	Pts	SW	SL	SR	SPW	SPL	SPR	Qualification
1	Czechoslovakia	3	3	0	6	9	2	4.500	154	111	1.387	Final places
2	Soviet Union	3	2	1	5	6	3	2.000	115	92	1.250	Final places
3	Cuba	3	1	2	4	5	6	0.833	124	136	0.912	7th–12th places
4	Brazil	3	0	3	3	0	9	0.000	82	136	0.603	7th–12th places

Date		Score		Set 1	Set 2	Set 3	Set 4	Set 5	Total
18 Oct	Czechoslovakia	3–0	Soviet Union	15–7	15–11	15–7			45–25
18 Oct	Cuba	3–0	Brazil	15–9	15–13	15–6			45–28
19 Oct	Soviet Union	3–0	Brazil	15–6	15–6	15–8			45–20
19 Oct	Czechoslovakia	3–2	Cuba	9–15	15–7	9–15	15–10	15–5	63–52
20 Oct	Soviet Union	3–0	Cuba	15–10	15–12	15–5			45–27
20 Oct	Czechoslovakia	3–0	Brazil	15–8	15–12	16–14			46–34

===== Pool I =====
Location: Toluca

Pos	Team	Pld	W	L	Pts	SW	SL	SR	SPW	SPL	SPR	Qualification
1	Japan	3	3	0	6	9	3	3.000	168	126	1.333	Final places
2	Romania	3	2	1	5	8	5	1.600	178	166	1.072	Final places
3	Bulgaria	3	1	2	4	6	7	0.857	174	153	1.137	7th–12th places
4	Netherlands	3	0	3	3	1	9	0.111	73	148	0.493	7th–12th places

Date		Score		Set 1	Set 2	Set 3	Set 4	Set 5	Total
18 Oct	Japan	3–0	Netherlands	15–6	15–3	15–4			45–13
18 Oct	Romania	3–2	Bulgaria	17–15	7–15	4–15	20–18	15–10	63–73
19 Oct	Romania	3–0	Netherlands	15–7	15–6	15–10			45–23
19 Oct	Japan	3–1	Bulgaria	15–10	15–9	8–15	15–9		53–43
20 Oct	Bulgaria	3–1	Netherlands	15–9	13–15	15–6	15–7		58–37
20 Oct	Japan	3–2	Romania	9–15	13–15	15–11	16–14	17–15	70–70

==== 13th–24th pools ====
===== Pool J =====
Location: Guadalajara

Pos	Team	Pld	W	L	Pts	SW	SL	SR	SPW	SPL	SPR	Qualification
1	United States	3	3	0	6	9	3	3.000	151	101	1.495	13th–18th places
2	Tunisia	3	2	1	5	7	5	1.400	134	142	0.944	13th–18th places
3	Canada	3	1	2	4	6	7	0.857	163	177	0.921	19th–24th places
4	Venezuela	3	0	3	3	2	9	0.222	126	154	0.818	19th–24th places

Date	Time		Score		Set 1	Set 2	Set 3	Set 4	Set 5	Total
18 Oct	10:00	Tunisia	3–2	Canada	15–10	11–15	13–15	15–13	15–11	69–64
18 Oct	12:00	United States	3–1	Venezuela	15–10	15–6	9–15	15–6		54–37
19 Oct	10:00	Canada	3–1	Venezuela	16–14	16–14	8–15	15–13		55–56
19 Oct	12:00	United States	3–0	Tunisia	15–9	15–3	15–8			45–20
20 Oct	10:00	Tunisia	3–0	Venezuela	15–11	15–9	15–13			45–33
20 Oct	18:00	United States	3–1	Canada	15–9	15–5	5–15	17–15		52–44

===== Pool K =====
Location: Monterrey

Pos	Team	Pld	W	L	Pts	SW	SL	SR	SPW	SPL	SPR	Qualification
1	China	3	3	0	6	9	2	4.500	151	88	1.716	13th–18th places
2	France	3	2	1	5	8	5	1.600	173	130	1.331	13th–18th places
3	Dominican Republic	3	1	2	4	5	6	0.833	109	133	0.820	19th–24th places
4	Puerto Rico	3	0	3	3	0	9	0.000	55	137	0.401	19th–24th places

Date	Time		Score		Set 1	Set 2	Set 3	Set 4	Set 5	Total
18 Oct		China	3–0	Dominican Republic	15–4	15–2	15–12			45–18
18 Oct		France	3–0	Puerto Rico	15–3	17–15	15–5			47–23
19 Oct		China	3–0	Puerto Rico	15–2	15–3	15–4			45–9
19 Oct		France	3–2	Dominican Republic	15–8	12–15	15–8	8–15	15–0	65–46
20 Oct		China	3–2	France	15–12	15–5	8–15	7–15	16–14	61–61
20 Oct		Dominican Republic	3–0	Puerto Rico	15–5	15–7	15–11			45–23

===== Pool L =====
Location: Tijuana

Pos	Team	Pld	W	L	Pts	SW	SL	SR	SPW	SPL	SPR	Qualification
1	South Korea	3	3	0	6	9	0	MAX	135	48	2.813	13th–18th places
2	Egypt	3	2	1	5	6	6	1.000	129	143	0.902	13th–18th places
3	Italy	3	1	2	4	5	6	0.833	132	118	1.119	19th–24th places
4	Panama	3	0	3	3	1	9	0.111	55	142	0.387	19th–24th places

Date	Time		Score		Set 1	Set 2	Set 3	Set 4	Set 5	Total
18 Oct	11:00	Italy	3–0	Panama	15–1	15–7	15–3			45–11
18 Oct	13:00	South Korea	3–0	Egypt	15–5	15–2	15–8			45–15
19 Oct		Egypt	3–2	Italy	15–13	15–6	5–15	11–15	16–14	62–63
19 Oct		South Korea	3–0	Panama	15–4	15–3	15–2			45–9
20 Oct		Egypt	3–1	Panama	15–10	7–15	15–7	15–3		52–35
20 Oct		South Korea	3–0	Italy	15–11	15–9	15–4			45–24

=== Final round ===
==== 19th–24th places ====
Location: Guadalajara

Pos	Team	Pld	W	L	Pts	SW	SL	SR	SPW	SPL	SPR
19	Italy	5	5	0	10	15	1	15.000	0	0	—
20	Canada	5	4	1	9	12	7	1.714	0	0	—
21	Venezuela	5	3	2	8	11	8	1.375	0	0	—
22	Dominican Republic	5	2	3	7	7	0	MAX	0	0	—
23	Puerto Rico	5	1	4	6	5	12	0.417	0	0	—
24	Panama	5	0	5	5	0	15	0.000	0	0	—

Date	Time		Score		Set 1	Set 2	Set 3	Set 4	Set 5	Total
22 Oct	09:30	Canada	3–1	Panama	15–1	15–4	12–15	15–10		57–30
22 Oct		Venezuela	3–0	Puerto Rico	15–4	15–4	15–6			45–14
22 Oct		Italy	3–1	Dominican Republic	13–15	15–4	15–7	15–4		58–30
23 Oct	09:30	Venezuela	3–2	Panama	14–16	15–12	15–10	9–15	15–12	68–65
23 Oct		Italy	3–0	Puerto Rico	15–8	15–3	15–6			45–17
23 Oct		Canada	3–0	Dominican Republic	15–13	15–4	5–13			45–30
24 Oct	09:30	Canada	3–2	Venezuela	3–15	15–13	7–15	15–10	15–7	55–60
24 Oct		Italy	3–0	Panama	15–8	15–3	15–4			45–15
24 Oct		Dominican Republic	3–1	Puerto Rico	15–13	15–12	11–15	15–12		56–52
26 Oct	09:30	Dominican Republic	3–2	Panama	15–5	10–15	15–5	4–15	15–8	59–48
26 Oct		Italy	3–1	Venezuela	15–10	7–15	15–7	15–3		52–35
26 Oct		Canada	3–1	Puerto Rico	15–11	12–15	15–9	15–2		57–37
27 Oct		Italy	3–0	Canada	15–6	15–13	15–12			45–31
27 Oct		Venezuela	3–0	Dominican Republic	15–4	15–10	15–9			45–23
27 Oct		Puerto Rico	3–0	Panama	15–6	15–10	15–9			45–25

==== 13th–18th places ====
Location: Tijuana

Pos	Team	Pld	W	L	Pts	SW	SL	SR	SPW	SPL	SPR
13	South Korea	5	5	0	10	15	2	7.500	243	166	1.464
14	United States	5	4	1	9	14	5	2.800	266	204	1.304
15	China	5	3	2	8	9	7	1.286	200	174	1.149
16	France	5	2	3	7	8	9	0.889	204	197	1.036
17	Egypt	5	1	4	6	4	14	0.286	197	262	0.752
18	Tunisia	5	0	5	5	2	15	0.133	146	253	0.577

Date		Score		Set 1	Set 2	Set 3	Set 4	Set 5	Total
22 Oct	China	3–1	France	9–15	15–12	15–6	15–13		54–46
22 Oct	United States	3–1	Egypt	15–13	15–17	17–15	15–10		62–55
22 Oct	South Korea	3–0	Tunisia	15–8	15–7	15–11			45–26
23 Oct	China	3–0	Egypt	15–10	15–7	15–7			45–24
23 Oct	South Korea	3–0	France	15–11	15–5	15–9			45–25
23 Oct	United States	3–0	Tunisia	15–12	15–1	15–4			45–17
24 Oct	France	3–0	Tunisia	15–11	15–4	15–9			45–24
24 Oct	South Korea	3–0	Egypt	15–11	15–5	15–10			45–26
24 Oct	United States	3–0	China	15–8	15–7	15–11			45–26
26 Oct	China	3–0	Tunisia	15–?	15–?	15–?			45–14
26 Oct	France	3–0	Egypt	15–7	15–5	15–7			45–19
26 Oct	South Korea	3–2	United States	15–11	15–12	12–15	6–15	15–6	63–59
27 Oct	United States	3–1	France	17–15	8–15	15–2	15–11		55–43
27 Oct	Egypt	3–2	Tunisia	14–16	15–11	9–15	20–18	15–5	73–65
27 Oct	South Korea	3–0	China	15–9	15–8	15–13			45–30

==== 7th–12th places ====
Location: Toluca

Pos	Team	Pld	W	L	Pts	SW	SL	SR	SPW	SPL	SPR
7	Bulgaria	5	4	1	9	12	3	4.000	218	143	1.524
8	Cuba	5	4	1	9	12	7	1.714	254	207	1.227
9	Brazil	5	3	2	8	10	6	1.667	211	186	1.134
10	Mexico	5	3	2	8	9	8	1.125	202	198	1.020
11	Belgium	5	1	4	6	7	13	0.538	220	0	MAX
12	Netherlands	5	0	5	5	2	15	0.133	0	253	0.000

Date		Score		Set 1	Set 2	Set 3	Set 4	Set 5	Total
22 Oct	Cuba	3–1	Netherlands	15–9	15–17	15–2	15–7		60–35
22 Oct	Bulgaria	3–0	Mexico	16–14	15–4	15–8			46–26
22 Oct	Brazil	3–0	Belgium	17–15	15–11	15–6			47–32
23 Oct	Mexico	3–2	Belgium	15–2	6–15	15–10	11–15	16–14	63–56
23 Oct	Brazil	3–0	Netherlands	15–5	15–5	15–12			45–22
23 Oct	Bulgaria	3–0	Cuba	15–8	15–9	15–11			45–28
24 Oct	Bulgaria	3–0	Netherlands	15–7	15–10	15–10			45–27
24 Oct	Cuba	3–2	Belgium	15–7	13–15	15–11	13–15	15–10	71–58
24 Oct	Mexico	3–0	Brazil	15–7	15–8	15–12			45–27
26 Oct	Bulgaria	3–0	Belgium	15–3	15–11	15–2			45–16
26 Oct	Cuba	3–1	Brazil	15–9	4–15	16–14	15–8		50–46
26 Oct	Mexico	3–0	Netherlands	15–5	15–13	15–6			45–24
27 Oct	Belgium	3–1	Netherlands	15–?	15–?	13–15	15–?		58–?
27 Oct	Brazil	3–0	Bulgaria	16–14	15–11	15–12			46–37
27 Oct	Cuba	3–0	Mexico	15–7	15–8	15–8			45–23

==== Final places ====
Location: Mexico City

Pos	Team	Pld	W	L	Pts	SW	SL	SR	SPW	SPL	SPR
1	Poland	5	5	0	10	15	7	2.143	314	231	1.359
2	Soviet Union	5	4	1	9	14	4	3.500	252	203	1.241
3	Japan	5	3	2	8	10	10	1.000	277	256	1.082
4	East Germany	5	2	3	7	9	11	0.818	238	249	0.956
5	Czechoslovakia	5	1	4	6	8	14	0.571	256	287	0.892
6	Romania	5	0	5	5	4	15	0.267	164	275	0.596

Date		Score		Set 1	Set 2	Set 3	Set 4	Set 5	Total
22 Oct	East Germany	3–2	Czechoslovakia	14–16	15–10	15–10	11–15	15–7	70–58
22 Oct	Poland	3–2	Soviet Union	16–14	9–15	15–6	12–15	15–7	67–57
22 Oct	Japan	3–2	Romania	15–6	12–15	16–18	15–1	15–6	73–46
23 Oct	Japan	3–1	East Germany	15–12	15–9	14–16	15–12		59–49
23 Oct	Poland	3–2	Czechoslovakia	13–15	14–16	15–6	15–10	15–5	72–52
23 Oct	Soviet Union	3–1	Romania	6–15	15–6	15–9	15–10		51–40
24 Oct	Poland	3–2	East Germany	15–7	15–9	13–15	12–15	15–5	70–51
24 Oct	Czechoslovakia	3–1	Romania	16–18	15–5	15–13	15–4		61–40
24 Oct	Soviet Union	3–0	Japan	15–10	16–14	18–16			49–40
26 Oct	Soviet Union	3–0	East Germany	17–15	15–2	15–6			47–23
26 Oct	Poland	3–0	Romania	15–4	15–10	15–9			45–23
26 Oct	Japan	3–1	Czechoslovakia	15–11	10–15	15–11	17–15		57–52
27 Oct	East Germany	3–0	Romania	15–4	15–9	15–2			45–15
27 Oct	Soviet Union	3–0	Czechoslovakia	18–16	15–12	15–5			48–33
28 Oct	Poland	3–1	Japan	13–15	15–7	15–11	17–15		60–48

== Final standing ==
Rank	Team
1st place, gold medalist(s)	Poland
2nd place, silver medalist(s)	Soviet Union
3rd place, bronze medalist(s)	Japan
4	East Germany
5	Czechoslovakia
6	Romania
7	Bulgaria
8	Cuba
9	Brazil
10	Mexico
11	Belgium
12	Netherlands
13	South Korea
14	United States
15	China
16	France
17	Egypt
18	Tunisia
19	Italy
20	Canada
21	Venezuela
22	Dominican Republic
23	Puerto Rico
24	Panama

1974 World Champions

Poland
First title

Team roster: Ryszard Bosek, Wiesław Czaja, Wiesław Gawłowski, Stanisław Gościniak, Marek Karbarz, Mirosław Rybaczewski, Włodzimierz Sadalski, Aleksander Skiba, Edward Skorek, Włodzimierz Stefański, Tomasz Wójtowicz, Zbigniew Zarzycki
Head coach: Hubert Wagner
