= Płomień Milowice =

Polish volleyball club

GKS Płomień Milowice
- Full name: Górniczy Klub Sportowy; Płomień Milowice
- Short name: Płomień Milowice
- Founded: 1929 (club); 1961 (volleyball teams)
- Dissolved: 1992

GKS Płomień Milowice was a volleyball section of the same name club from Poland, located in the city of Sosnowiec, founded in 1961. Płomień Milowice was one of the most important sports clubs in Poland during the PRL era. In 1992, the club was replaced by Płomień Sosnowiec.

== History ==
Płomień Milowice was founded in 1929. Throughout the years, the club had teams of different sports: football, judo, gymnastics, boxing, chess and volleyball, with the latter created in 1961. The first success is dated to 1974, when Płomień Milowice won the championship in the women's team. The club dominated the national scene between the seventies and the eighties, winning a total of 7 domestic titles and one cup. The greatest success was achieved by the male team, which in 1978 won the European Champions Cup, the most prestigious European club volleyball competition. At the end of 1991, Płomień Milowice finished in 4th place in the men's domestic competition and in 6th in the women's, the club has been disbanded in the next year.

== Honours ==
=== Men's volleyball ===
==== Domestic ====
- Polish Championship

Winners (2): 1976–77, 1978–79

- Polish Cup

Winners (1): 1984–85

==== International ====
- CEV European Champions Cup

Winners (1): 1977–78
Semifinalists (1): 1978–79

=== Women's volleyball ===
- Polish Championship

Winners (5): 1973–74, 1974–75, 1978–79, 1979–80, 1980–81
