= Legia Warsaw (men's volleyball) =

Polish volleyball club

- Nickname: Legioniści (The Legionaries)
- Founded: 1929; 96 years ago
- Dissolved: 2023

Legia Warszawa, known in English as Legia Warsaw, was a Polish professional men's volleyball club based in Warsaw, founded in 1929. Domestically, the club won 8 league titles and 5 national cups, and on the international stage reached the semifinals of the CEV European Champions Cup two times. The club declared bankruptcy in 2023.

== Honours ==
=== Domestic ===
- Polish Championship

Winners (8): 1961–62, 1963–64, 1966–67, 1968–69, 1969–70, 1982–83, 1983–84, 1985–86

- Polish Cup

Winners (5): 1952, 1960–61, 1983–84, 1985–86, 1994–95

=== International ===
- CEV European Champions Cup

Semifinalists (2): 1962–63, 1967–68

== See also ==
- Legia Warsaw players
- Legia Warsaw coaches
