= AZS AWF Warsaw (men's volleyball) =

Polish volleyball club

- Full name: Akademicki Związek Sportowy Akademii Wychowania Fizycznego w Warszawie
- Founded: 1949
- Dissolved: 1995

AZS AWF Warszawa, known in English as AZS AWF Warsaw, was a Polish men's volleyball team based in Warsaw, founded in 1949 as a university team (AZS) and dissolved in 1995. It was the most successful Polish volleyball club of the 20th century in terms of the number of league titles before the establishment of the professional volleyball league.

== Honours ==
=== Domestic ===
- Polish Championship

Winners (14): 1952, 1953, 1953–54, 1954–55, 1955–56, 1956–57, 1957–58, 1958–59, 1959–60, 1960–61, 1962–63, 1964–65, 1965–66, 1967–68

- Polish Cup

Winners (3): 1953, 1953–54, 1954

=== International ===
- CEV European Champions Cup

Semifinalists (1): 1959–60
