= 1977 Men's European Volleyball Championship =

Tournament details
- Host country: Finland
- Dates: September 25–October 2
- Teams: 12
- Venues: 4 (in 4 host cities)

Final positions
- Champions: Soviet Union (6th title)

The 1977 Men's European Volleyball Championship was the tenth edition of the event, organized by Europe's governing volleyball body, the Confédération Européenne de Volleyball. It was hosted in Helsinki, Finland, Tampere, Turku and Oulu from September 25 to October 2, 1977, with the final round held in Helsinki.

== Teams ==
Group A – (Helsinki)

| Place | Team |
|---|---|
| 1. | Romania |
| 2. | Hungary |
| 3. | Yugoslavia |
| 4. | Italy |
| 5. | France |
| 6. | Finland |

Group B – (Tampere)

| Place | Team |
|---|---|
| 1. | Soviet Union |
| 2. | Poland |
| 3. | Bulgaria |
| 4. | Czechoslovakia |
| 5. | East Germany |
| 6. | Netherlands |

== Preliminary round ==
The 12 participating teams were split into two groups of six, with matches played in a round-robin format. The top three teams from each group advanced to the Final Round (1st–6th place), while the remaining teams proceeded to the 7th–12th Classification Round.

Tournament Group A Stage Standings
| Pos | Team | Pts | P | W | L | Set Ratio | Point Ratio | Qualification |
|---|---|---|---|---|---|---|---|---|
| 1 | Romania | 9 | 5 | 4 | 1 | 14:7 (2.000) | 1.171 | Final Round |
| 2 | Hungary | 8 | 5 | 3 | 2 | 11:10 (1.100) | 1.000 | Final Round |
| 3 | Yugoslavia | 7 | 5 | 2 | 3 | 11:13 (0.846) | 0.985 | Final Round |
| 4 | Italy | 7 | 5 | 2 | 3 | 10:13 (0.769) | 0.949 | Classification Round |
| 5 | France | 7 | 5 | 2 | 3 | 9:13 (0.692) | 0.966 | Classification Round |
| 6 | Finland | 7 | 5 | 2 | 3 | 10:14 (0.714) | 0.941 | Classification Round |

Tournament Group B Stage Standings
| Pos | Team | Pts | P | W | L | Set Ratio | Point Ratio | Qualification |
|---|---|---|---|---|---|---|---|---|
| 1 | Soviet Union | 10 | 5 | 5 | 0 | 15:3 (5.000) | 1.341 | Final Round |
| 2 | Poland | 9 | 5 | 4 | 1 | 13:6 (2.167) | 1.144 | Final Round |
| 3 | Czechoslovakia | 8 | 5 | 3 | 2 | 10:7 (1.429) | 1.111 | Final Round |
| 4 | Bulgaria | 7 | 5 | 2 | 3 | 9:11 (0.818) | 0.956 | Classification Round |
| 5 | East Germany | 6 | 5 | 1 | 4 | 4:12 (0.333) | 0.865 | Classification Round |
| 6 | Netherlands | 5 | 5 | 0 | 5 | 3:15 (0.200) | 0.771 | Classification Round |

== Final round ==
The Final Round of the 1977 Men's European Volleyball Championship was for places 1st through 6th and featured the top three teams from each of the two preliminary groups. The final round was held in Helsinki, Finland.

The teams that advanced to the Final Round were:

From Group A: Romania, Hungary, Yugoslavia

From Group B: Soviet Union, Poland, Czechoslovakia

Tournament Final Round Standings
| Rank | Team | Matches Played | W | L | Pts | SW | SL | Set Ratio | Point Ratio |
|---|---|---|---|---|---|---|---|---|---|
| 1 | Soviet Union | 5 | 5 | 0 | 10 | 15 | 3 | 15:3 (5.000) | 1.523 |
| 2 | Poland | 5 | 4 | 1 | 9 | 13 | 5 | 13:5 (2.600) | 1.229 |
| 3 | Romania | 5 | 3 | 2 | 8 | 10 | 10 | 10:10 (1.000) | 0.981 |
| 4 | Hungary | 5 | 2 | 3 | 7 | 10 | 11 | 10:11 (0.909) | 0.966 |
| 5 | Bulgaria | 5 | 1 | 4 | 6 | 6 | 13 | 6:13 (0.461) | 0.852 |
| 6 | Czechoslovakia | 5 | 0 | 5 | 5 | 4 | 16 | 4:16 (0.250) | 0.725 |

The Soviet Union won the championship (their 6th title). They defeated Poland in the Gold medal match with a score of 3–1. Romania won the bronze medal, defeating Hungary 3–0 in the 3rd place match.

== Final ranking ==
| Place | Team |
|---|---|
| 1st place, gold medalist(s) | Soviet Union |
| 2nd place, silver medalist(s) | Poland |
| 3rd place, bronze medalist(s) | Romania |
| 4. | Hungary |
| 5. | Bulgaria |
| 6. | Czechoslovakia |
| 7. | Yugoslavia |
| 8. | Italy |
| 9. | East Germany |
| 10. | France |
| 11. | Finland |
| 12. | Netherlands |

1977 Men's European champions

Soviet Union
Sixth title
