= Men's European Volleyball Championship =

Recurring volleyball competition

- Most recent season or competition: 2026 Men's European Volleyball Championship
- Sport: Volleyball
- Founded: 1948; 78 years ago
- First season: 1948
- No. of teams: 24 (Finals)
- Continent: Europe (CEV)
- Most recent champion: Poland (3rd title)
- Most titles: Russia (14 titles)
- Website: https://eurovolley.cev.eu/

The Men's European Volleyball Championship (EuroVolley) is the official competition for senior men's national volleyball teams of Europe, organized by the European Volleyball Confederation (CEV). The initial gap between championships was variable, but since 1975 they have been awarded every two years. The current champion is Poland, which won two consecutive titles at the 2023 and 2026 editions.

== History ==
The first tournament was held in 1948 with participation of six national teams. Being only participant from Eastern Europe, Czechoslovakia captured gold. The teams from Eastern Europe dominated at the tournament for next four decades. The next two editions held in 1950 and 1951 were won by the Soviet Union (who also won two World Championships in 1949 and 1952). However, in late 1950s Czechoslovakia returned to first position. They captured European gold in 1955 and repeated this success at next edition in 1958 (also winning World Championship in 1956). In 1963, twice runner-up Romania won its maiden European title at the home tournament.

The victory in 1967 marked the beginning of the 20-year era of dominance of the Soviet Union. From 1967 to 1987, Soviet team didn't lose any tournament by winning 9 European titles in a row. The names of leading Soviet players of these times such as Vyacheslav Zaytsev, Aleksandr Savin, Vladimir Kondra, Viljar Loor, Yury Panchenko and Vladimir Chernyshyov are known to volleyball enthusiasts all over the world. From 1977 to 1985, Soviet team was coached by Vyacheslav Platonov who led national team to five European titles in a row as well as to two World Championship titles (1978, 1982), two World Cup titles (1977, 1981) and Olympic gold in 1980. The main European rival of Soviet team at these times, Poland (1974 World Champion and 1976 Olympic Champion) was runner-up for the five times in a row (from 1975 to 1983).

Soviet domination was ceased in 1989 when Italy under leadership of Argentinian coach Julio Velasco unprecedentally won their first ever official tournament. Soviet team surprisingly failed to even reach podium after losing to Sweden (hosts) in semifinals and to Netherlands in a bronze-medal match. However, in 1991, in their last participation at the competition, Soviet Union won European title for the 12th time after 3–0 victories over a Netherlands in semifinals and Italy in the final match. Vyacheslav Platonov won European title as head coach for the record sixth time.

Following the Soviet Union's dissolution in December 1991, Italy led by such players as Andrea Gardini, Andrea Giani, Paolo Tofoli and Lorenzo Bernardi became indisputably the best team not only in Europe but also in the world. They won three World Championships in a row (1990, 1994, 1998) and also dominated at European Championships by winning five of the next seven tournaments (from 1993 to 2005). However, ironically they never managed to win Olympic gold. Netherlands who became Olympic Champion in 1996 also won their maiden European title at the home tournament next year. FR Yugoslavia who won Olympic gold in 2000 also became European Champion for the first time at the next-year tournament.

After victory in 2005, the period of Italy's dominance came to end, and more national teams won their maiden European titles. The next tournament was surprisingly won by Spain who beat home favorites – Russia – in a closest 5th-set tie-breaker. In 2009, Poland became European Champion for the first time. The next tournament was won by Serbia for the first time since dissolution of the Serbia and Montenegro (the country which was previously known as FR Yugoslavia). In 2013, Russia (who became Olympic Champion in 2012) finally won their first European title since the Soviet Union's dissolution. The next edition was successful for France who also won their maiden European gold.

The 2017 European Championship took place in Poland. It was won by Russia who defeated Germany in a 5th-set tie-breaker. The 2019 European Championship was co-hosted by four countries for first time – France, Slovenia, Belgium and the Netherlands. Serbia won this tournament after 3–1 victory over Slovenia in the final match in Paris. The co-host countries of 2021 edition were Poland, Czech Republic, Estonia and Finland. In the final match held in Katowice, Italy defeated Slovenia in a 5th-set tie-breaker and won their seventh European title – the first in 16 years. Next year Italy achieved another success in Katowice by defeating Poland at the opponent's home ground in the final match of the 2022 World Championship. However, next year Poland took revenge by beating Italy 3–0 in a final match of the 2023 European Championship which was held in Rome. It was the second European victory in the history of Polish men's national volleyball team.

The 33 European Championship tournaments have been won by nine different nations. Russia have won fourteen times (twelve as Soviet Union). The other European Championship winners are Italy, with seven titles; Czech Republic (as Czechoslovakia), Serbia (one as FR Yugoslavia) and Poland with three titles each; and France, Netherlands, Romania and Spain, with one title each.

In the 21st century, Italy and Poland are the only national teams to have successfully defended their European Championship titles, winning consecutive editions in 2003 and 2005 and 2023 and 2026.

The current format of the competition involves a qualification phase, which currently takes place over the preceding two years, to determine which teams qualify for the tournament phase, which is often called the European Championship Finals. 24 teams, including the automatically qualifying host nation(s), compete in the tournament phase for the title at venues within the host nation(s) over a period of about two weeks.

Italy holds record for the participation at the European Championships (32 times) by missing only one tournament. Bulgaria and France participated at the 31 continental tournaments each. Russia also participated at the 31 European Championships (sixteen as Soviet Union).

== Results summary ==
Year	Host	Final			3rd place match			Teams
Year	Host	Champions	Score	Runners-up	3rd place	Score	4th place	Teams
1948; Details	Italy	Czechoslovakia	Round-robin (3–0)	France	Italy	Round-robin (3–0)	Portugal	6
1950; Details	Bulgaria	Soviet Union	Round-robin (3–0)	Czechoslovakia	Hungary	Round-robin (3–2)	Bulgaria	6
1951; Details	France	Soviet Union	Round-robin (3–0)	Bulgaria	France	Round-robin (0–3)	Romania	10
1955; Details	Romania	Czechoslovakia	Round-robin (3–1)	Romania	Bulgaria	Round-robin (3–2)	Soviet Union	14
1958; Details	Czechoslovakia	Czechoslovakia	Round-robin (3–1)	Romania	Soviet Union	Round-robin (3–2)	Bulgaria	20
1963; Details	Romania	Romania	Round-robin (3–0)	Hungary	Soviet Union	Round-robin (3–2)	Bulgaria	17
1967; Details	Turkey	Soviet Union	Round-robin (3–2)	Czechoslovakia	Poland	Round-robin (1–3)	East Germany	20
1971; Details	Italy	Soviet Union	Round-robin (0–3)	Czechoslovakia	Romania	Round-robin (3–0)	East Germany	22
1975; Details	(Socialist Federal Republic of Yugoslavia); Yugoslavia	Soviet Union	Round-robin (3–0)	Poland	Yugoslavia	Round-robin (3–2)	Romania	12
1977; Details	Finland	Soviet Union	3–1	Poland	Romania	3–0	Hungary	12
1979; Details	France	Soviet Union	Round-robin (3–0)	Poland	Yugoslavia	Round-robin (3–0)	France	12
1981; Details	Bulgaria	Soviet Union	Round-robin (3–0)	Poland	Bulgaria	Round-robin (3–1)	Czechoslovakia	12
1983; Details	East Germany	Soviet Union	Round-robin (3–1)	Poland	Bulgaria	Round-robin (2–3)	Italy	12
1985; Details	Netherlands	Soviet Union	Round-robin (3–0)	Czechoslovakia	France	Round-robin (3–1)	Poland	12
1987; Details	Belgium	Soviet Union	3–1	France	Greece	3–2	Sweden	12
1989; Details	Sweden	Italy	3–1	Sweden	Netherlands	3–0	Soviet Union	12
1991; Details	Germany	Soviet Union	3–0	Italy	Netherlands	3–0	Germany	12
1993; Details	Finland	Italy	3–2	Netherlands	Russia	3–1	Germany	12
1995; Details	Greece	Italy	3–2	Netherlands	FR Yugoslavia	3–0	Bulgaria	12
1997; Details	Netherlands	Netherlands	3–1	FR Yugoslavia	Italy	3–1	France	12
1999; Details	Austria	Italy	3–1	Russia	FR Yugoslavia	3–0	Czech Republic	8
2001; Details	Czech Republic	FR Yugoslavia	3–0	Italy	Russia	3–2	Czech Republic	12
2003; Details	Germany	Italy	3–2	France	Russia	3–1	Serbia and Montenegro	12
2005; Details	Italy / Serbia and Montenegro	Italy	3–2	Russia	Serbia and Montenegro	3–0	Spain	12
2007; Details	Russia	Spain	3–2	Russia	Serbia	3–1	Finland	16
2009; Details	Turkey	Poland	3–1	France	Bulgaria	3–0	Russia	16
2011; Details	Austria / Czech Republic	Serbia	3–1	Italy	Poland	3–1	Russia	16
2013; Details	Denmark / Poland	Russia	3–1	Italy	Serbia	3–0	Bulgaria	16
2015; Details	Bulgaria / Italy	France	3–0	Slovenia	Italy	3–1	Bulgaria	16
2017; Details	Poland	Russia	3–2	Germany	Serbia	3–2	Belgium	16
2019; Details	France / Slovenia / Belgium / Netherlands	Serbia	3–1	Slovenia	Poland	3–0	France	24
2021; Details	Poland / Czech Republic / Estonia / Finland	Italy	3–2	Slovenia	Poland	3–0	Serbia	24
2023; Details	Italy / Bulgaria / North Macedonia / Israel	Poland	3–0	Italy	Slovenia	3–2	France	24
2026; Details	Bulgaria / Finland / Italy / Romania	Poland	3–1	France	Finland	3–0	Slovenia	24
2028; Details	(N/A) (N/A) (N/A); Montenegro							24

== Medals summary ==
Rank	Nation	Gold	Silver	Bronze	Total
1	Russia (Note: Soviet Union won 12 gold and 2 bronze medals. The CEV recognizes the Russian national team as the successor to the Soviet Union's sporting achievements and results.)	14	3	5	22
2	Italy	7	5	3	15
3	Poland	3	5	4	12
4	Czech Republic (Note: Czechoslovakia won 3 gold and 4 silver medals. The CEV recognizes the Czechia national team as the successor to the Czechoslovakia sporting achievements and results)	3	4	0	7
5	Serbia (Note: Yugoslavia and Serbia and Montenegro won 1 gold, 1 silver and 5 bronze medals.The CEV recognizes the Serbian national team as the successor to the Yugoslavia and Serbia and Montenegro sporting achievements and results)	3	1	8	12
6	France	1	5	2	8
7	Netherlands	1	2	2	5
7	Romania	1	2	2	5
9	Spain	1	0	0	1
10	Slovenia	0	3	1	4
11	Bulgaria	0	1	4	5
12	Hungary	0	1	1	2
13	Germany	0	1	0	1
13	Sweden	0	1	0	1
15	Finland	0	0	1	1
15	Greece	0	0	1	1
Totals (16 entries)		34	34	34	102

== Total hosts ==
Hosts	Nations (Year(s))
6	Italy (1948, 1971, 2005*, 2015*, 2023*, 2026*)
5	Bulgaria (1950, 1981, 2015*, 2023*, 2026*)
4	Finland (1977, 1993, 2021*, 2026*)
3	Czech Republic (2001, 2011*, 2021*); France (1951, 1979, 2019*); Netherlands (1985, 1997, 2019*); Poland (2013*, 2017, 2021*); Romania (1955, 1963, 2026*)
2	Austria (1999, 2011*); Belgium (1987, 2019*); Germany (1991, 2003); Turkey (1967, 2009)
1	Czechoslovakia (1958); Denmark (2013*); East Germany (1983); Estonia (2021*); Greece (1995); Israel (2023*); Montenegro (2028*); North Macedonia (2023*); Russia (2007); Serbia and Montenegro (2005*); Slovenia (2019*); Sweden (1989); Yugoslavia (1975)

* = co-hosts

== Participating nations ==
Legend

- 1st – Champions
- 2nd – Runners-up
- 3rd – Third place
- 4th – Fourth place
- • – Did not enter / Did not qualify
- – Hosts
- Q – Qualified for forthcoming tournament

Team	(Italy); 1948 (6)	(Bulgaria); 1950 (6)	(France); 1951 (10)	(Romania); 1955 (14)	(Czechoslovakia); 1958 (20)	(Romania); 1963 (17)	(Turkey); 1967 (20)	(Italy); 1971 (22)	(Socialist Federal Republic of Yugoslavia); 1975 (12)	(Finland); 1977 (12)	(France); 1979 (12)	(Bulgaria); 1981 (12)	(East Germany); 1983 (12)	(Netherlands); 1985 (12)	(Belgium); 1987 (12)	(Sweden); 1989 (12)	(Germany); 1991 (12)	(Finland); 1993 (12)	(Greece); 1995 (12)	(Netherlands); 1997 (12)	(Austria); 1999 (8)	(Czech Republic); 2001 (12)	(Germany); 2003 (12)	(Italy) (Serbia and Montenegro); 2005 (12)
Albania	•	•	•	10th	11th	•	13th	•	•	•	•	•	•	•	•	•	•	•	•	•	•	•	•	•
Austria	•	•	•	13th	18th	16th	19th	21st	•	•	•	•	•	•	•	•	•	•	•	•	8th	•	•	•
Belgium	5th	•	6th	12th	17th	13th	12th	10th	12th	•	11th	•	•	•	7th	•	•	•	•	•	•	•	•	•
Bulgaria	•	4th	2nd	3rd	4th	4th	9th	7th	5th	5th	10th	3rd	3rd	5th	11th	6th	5th	5th	4th	9th	7th	6th	9th	•
Croatia	Part of Yugoslavia																	•	•	•	•	•	•	8th
Czech Republic	Part of Czechoslovakia																		10th	6th	4th	4th	10th	9th
Denmark	•	•	•	•	20th	17th	•	20th	•	•	•	•	•	•	•	•	•	•	•	•	•	•	•	•
Egypt	•	•	•	14th	15th	•	•	•	•	•	•	•	•	•	•	•	•	•	•	•	•	•	•	•
Estonia	Part of Soviet Union																	•	•	•	•	•	•	•
Finland	•	•	•	11th	14th	14th	17th	13th	•	11th	•	9th	7th	•	•	•	8th	10th	•	12th	•	•	•	•
France	2nd	•	3rd	8th	8th	8th	10th	14th	8th	10th	4th	8th	12th	3rd	2nd	5th	9th	9th	•	4th	6th	7th	2nd	7th
Germany	Part of East Germany and West Germany																4th	4th	8th	10th	•	11th	7th	•
Greece	•	•	•	•	•	•	20th	18th	•	•	12th	•	9th	8th	3rd	10th	11th	•	7th	11th	•	•	11th	6th
Hungary	•	3rd	•	7th	5th	2nd	6th	5th	11th	4th	8th	•	11th	•	•	•	•	•	•	•	•	9th	•	•
Israel	•	•	10th	•	•	•	11th	12th	•	•	•	•	•	•	•	•	•	•	•	•	•	•	•	•
Italy	3rd	•	8th	9th	10th	10th	8th	8th	10th	8th	5th	7th	4th	6th	9th	1st	2nd	1st	1st	3rd	1st	2nd	1st	1st
Latvia	Part of Soviet Union																	•	11th	•	•	•	•	•
Montenegro	Part of Yugoslavia																	Part of Serbia and Montenegro						
Netherlands	6th	•	9th	•	13th	12th	15th	9th	9th	12th	•	•	10th	10th	5th	3rd	3rd	2nd	2nd	1st	5th	8th	6th	11th
North Macedonia	Part of Yugoslavia																	•	•	•	•	•	•	•
Poland	•	6th	•	6th	6th	6th	3rd	6th	2nd	2nd	2nd	2nd	2nd	4th	•	7th	7th	7th	6th	•	•	5th	5th	5th
Portugal	4th	•	7th	•	•	•	•	•	•	•	•	•	•	•	•	•	•	•	•	•	•	•	•	10th
Romania	•	5th	4th	2nd	2nd	1st	5th	3rd	4th	3rd	7th	5th	8th	7th	10th	12th	•	•	12th	•	•	•	•	•
Russia	Part of Soviet Union																	3rd	5th	5th	2nd	3rd	3rd	2nd
Scotland	•	•	•	•	•	•	•	22nd	•	•	•	•	•	•	•	•	•	•	•	•	•	•	•	•
Serbia	Part of Yugoslavia																	Part of Serbia and Montenegro						
Slovakia	Part of Czechoslovakia																		•	8th	•	10th	12th	•
Slovenia	Part of Yugoslavia																	•	•	•	•	12th	•	•
Spain	•	•	•	•	•	•	•	•	•	•	•	12th	•	12th	12th	•	•	11th	•	•	•	•	8th	4th
Sweden	•	•	•	•	•	•	16th	17th	•	•	•	•	•	9th	4th	2nd	10th	12th	•	•	•	•	•	•
Switzerland	•	•	•	•	•	•	•	19th	•	•	•	•	•	•	•	•	•	•	•	•	•	•	•	•
Tunisia	•	•	•	•	16th	•	•	•	•	•	•	•	•	•	•	•	•	•	•	•	•	•	•	•
Turkey	•	•	•	•	12th	11th	14th	15th	•	•	•	•	•	•	•	•	•	•	•	•	•	•	•	•
Ukraine	Part of Soviet Union																	6th	9th	7th	•	•	•	12th
Discontinued nations
Czechoslovakia	1st	2nd	•	1st	1st	5th	2nd	2nd	6th	6th	6th	4th	5th	2nd	6th	•	12th	8th	discontinued					
East Germany	•	•	•	•	9th	9th	4th	4th	7th	9th	9th	6th	6th	•	•	9th	discontinued							
Serbia and Montenegro	Part of Yugoslavia																	•	3rd	2nd	3rd	1st	4th	3rd
Soviet Union	•	1st	1st	4th	3rd	3rd	1st	1st	1st	1st	1st	1st	1st	1st	1st	4th	1st	discontinued						
West Germany	•	•	•	•	19th	15th	18th	16th	•	•	•	11th	•	•	•	11th	discontinued							
Yugoslavia	•	•	5th	5th	7th	7th	7th	11th	3rd	7th	3rd	10th	•	11th	8th	8th	6th	discontinued						
Team	(Italy); 1948 (6)	(Bulgaria); 1950 (6)	(France); 1951 (10)	(Romania); 1955 (14)	(Czechoslovakia); 1958 (20)	(Romania); 1963 (17)	(Turkey); 1967 (20)	(Italy); 1971 (22)	(Socialist Federal Republic of Yugoslavia); 1975 (12)	(Finland); 1977 (12)	(France); 1979 (12)	(Bulgaria); 1981 (12)	(East Germany); 1983 (12)	(Netherlands); 1985 (12)	(Belgium); 1987 (12)	(Sweden); 1989 (12)	(Germany); 1991 (12)	(Finland); 1993 (12)	(Greece); 1995 (12)	(Netherlands); 1997 (12)	(Austria); 1999 (8)	(Czech Republic); 2001 (12)	(Germany); 2003 (12)	(Italy) (Serbia and Montenegro); 2005 (12)

Team	(Russia); 2007 (16)	(Turkey); 2009 (16)	(Austria) (Czech Republic); 2011 (16)	(Denmark) (Poland); 2013 (16)	(Bulgaria) (Italy); 2015 (16)	(Poland); 2017 (16)	(France) (Slovenia) (Belgium) (Netherlands); 2019 (24)	(Poland) (Czech Republic) (Estonia) (Finland); 2021 (24)	(Italy) (North Macedonia) (Bulgaria) (Israel); 2023 (24)	(Italy) (Bulgaria) (Finland) (Romania); 2026 (24)	(Montenegro); 2028 (24)	Total
Albania	•	•	•	•	•	•	•	•	•	•		3
Austria	•	•	16th	•	•	•	23rd	•	•	•		8
Belarus	•	•	•	15th	16th	•	22nd	17th	•	•		4
Belgium	10th	•	13th	7th	10th	4th	9th	18th	14th	6th		19
Bulgaria	8th	3rd	6th	4th	4th	6th	11th	12th	15th	9th		32
Croatia	14th	•	•	•	15th	•	•	14th	11th	•		5
Czech Republic	•	16th	10th	16th	13th	7th	13th	8th	12th	12th		15
Denmark	•	•	•	12th	•	•	•	•	24th	14th	Q	7
Egypt	•	•	•	•	•	•	•	•	•	•		2
Estonia	•	14th	12th	•	11th	13th	24th	20th	22nd	17th		8
Finland	4th	12th	8th	8th	12th	12th	14th	11th	19th	3rd	Q	22
France	9th	2nd	7th	5th	1st	9th	4th	9th	4th	2nd		32
Germany	5th	6th	15th	6th	8th	2nd	8th	6th	9th	7th		16
Greece	13th	8th	•	•	•	•	16th	22nd	20th	11th		18
Hungary	•	•	•	•	•	•	•	•	•	•		11
Israel	•	•	•	•	•	•	•	•	18th	22nd	Q	6
Italy	6th	10th	2nd	2nd	3rd	5th	6th	1st	2nd	5th		33
Latvia	•	•	•	•	•	•	•	16th	•	15th		3
Montenegro	•	•	•	•	•	•	18th	24th	21st	•	Q	4
Netherlands	7th	7th	•	10th	9th	14th	10th	5th	5th	23rd	Q	30
North Macedonia	•	•	•	•	•	•	17th	23rd	16th	20th		4
Poland	11th	1st	3rd	9th	5th	10th	3rd	3rd	1st	1st	Q	30
Portugal	•	•	14th	•	•	•	20th	15th	10th	16th		8
Romania	•	•	•	•	•	•	21st	•	7th	8th		19
Russia	2nd	4th	4th	1st	6th	1st	5th	7th	•	•		15
Scotland	•	•	•	•	•	•	•	•	•	•		1
Serbia	3rd	5th	1st	3rd	7th	3rd	1st	4th	6th	13th		10
Slovakia	12th	11th	5th	11th	14th	15th	19th	19th	•	24th		12
Slovenia	16th	15th	9th	13th	2nd	8th	2nd	2nd	3rd	4th		11
Spain	1st	9th	•	•	•	16th	15th	21st	17th	•		12
Sweden	•	•	•	•	•	•	•	•	•	18th		8
Switzerland	•	•	•	•	•	•	•	•	23rd	21st		3
Tunisia	•	•	•	•	•	•	•	•	•	•		1
Turkey	15th	13th	11th	14th	•	11th	12th	10th	13th	19th		13
Ukraine	•	•	•	•	•	•	7th	13th	8th	10th		8
Team	(Russia); 2007 (16)	(Turkey); 2009 (16)	(Austria) (Czech Republic); 2011 (16)	(Denmark) (Poland); 2013 (16)	(Bulgaria) (Italy); 2015 (16)	(Poland); 2017 (16)	(France) (Slovenia) (Belgium) (Netherlands); 2019 (24)	(Poland) (Czech Republic) (Estonia) (Finland); 2021 (24)	(Italy) (North Macedonia) (Bulgaria) (Israel); 2023 (24)	(Italy) (Bulgaria) (Finland) (Romania); 2026 (24)	(Montenegro); 2028 (24)	Total
Discontinued nations
Czechoslovakia												16
East Germany												10
Serbia and Montenegro												6
Soviet Union												16
West Germany												6
Yugoslavia												14

== Most valuable player by edition ==
- 1948–1977 – Not awarded
- 1979 – Vladimir Kondra (URS)
- 1983 – Franco Bertoli (ITA)
- 1985 – Vyacheslav Zaytsev (URS)
- 1987 – Philippe Blain (FRA)
- 1989 – Bengt Gustafsson (SWE)
- 1991 – Dmitry Fomin (URS)
- 1993 – Andrea Giani (ITA)
- 1995 – Lorenzo Bernardi (ITA)
- 1997 – Guido Görtzen (NED)
- 1999 – Andrea Giani (ITA)
- 2001 – Ivan Miljković (YUG)
- 2003 – Andrea Sartoretti (ITA)
- 2005 – Alberto Cisolla (ITA)
- 2007 – Semyon Poltavskiy (RUS)
- 2009 – Piotr Gruszka (POL)
- 2011 – Ivan Miljković (SRB)
- 2013 – Dmitry Muserskiy (RUS)
- 2015 – Antonin Rouzier (FRA)
- 2017 – Maxim Mikhaylov (RUS)
- 2019 – Uroš Kovačević (SRB)
- 2021 – Simone Giannelli (ITA)
- 2023 – Wilfredo León (POL)
- 2026 – Wilfredo León (POL)

== Most successful players ==
Boldface denotes active volleyball players and highest medal count among all players (including these who not included in these tables) per type.

=== Multiple gold medalists ===
Rank	Player	Country	From	To	Gold	Silver	Bronze	Total
1	Aleksandr Savin	Soviet Union	1975	1985	**6**	–	–	**6**
1	Vyacheslav Zaytsev	Soviet Union	1975	1985	**6**	–	–	**6**
3	Vladimir Kondra	Soviet Union	1971	1981	5	–	–	5
3	Viljar Loor	Soviet Union	1975	1983	5	–	–	5
3	Yury Panchenko	Soviet Union	1979	1987	5	–	–	5
6	Andrea Gardini	Italy	1989	1999	4	1	1	**6**
6	Andrea Giani	Italy	1991	2003	4	1	1	**6**
8	Paolo Tofoli	Italy	1989	1999	4	1	–	5
9	Marco Bracci	Italy	1989	1999	4	–	–	4
9	Vladimir Chernyshyov	Soviet Union	1975	1981	4	–	–	4
9	Vladimir Dorokhov	Soviet Union	1975	1981	4	–	–	4
9	Oleg Moliboga	Soviet Union	1977	1983	4	–	–	4
9	Pāvels Seļivanovs	Soviet Union	1975	1983	4	–	–	4
9	Vladimir Shkurikhin	Soviet Union	1981	1987	4	–	–	4

=== Multiple medalists ===
The table shows players who have won at least 6 medals in total at the European Championships.

Rank	Player	Country	From	To	Gold	Silver	Bronze	Total
1	Aleksandr Savin	Soviet Union	1975	1985	**6**	–	–	6
1	Vyacheslav Zaytsev	Soviet Union	1975	1985	**6**	–	–	6
3	Andrea Gardini	Italy	1989	1999	4	1	1	6
3	Andrea Giani	Italy	1991	2003	4	1	1	6
5	Slobodan Boškan	FR Yugoslavia; Serbia and Montenegro; Serbia	1995	2007	1	1	**4**	6
5	Andrija Gerić	FR Yugoslavia; Serbia and Montenegro; Serbia	1995	2007	1	1	**4**	6
5	Nikola Grbić	FR Yugoslavia; Serbia and Montenegro; Serbia	1995	2007	1	1	**4**	6

== See also ==
- Women's European Volleyball Championship
- Men's European Volleyball League
- Men's Junior European Volleyball Championship
- Boys' Youth European Volleyball Championship
