= 1975 Men's European Volleyball Championship =

Tournament details
- Host country: (Socialist Federal Republic of Yugoslavia) Yugoslavia
- Dates: October 18–25
- Teams: 12
- Venues: 3 (in 3 host cities)

Final positions
- Champions: Soviet Union (5th title)

The 1975 Men's European Volleyball Championship was the ninth edition of the event, organized by Europe's governing volleyball body, the Confédération Européenne de Volleyball. It was hosted in Skopje, Kraljevo and Subotica, Yugoslavia from October 18 to October 25, 1975, with the final round held in Belgrade.

== Teams ==
Group A – Skopje SRC Kale

- Hungary
- Italy
- Poland
- Yugoslavia

Group B – Subotica

- Bulgaria
- East Germany
- France
- Soviet Union

Group C – Kraljevo

- Belgium
- Czechoslovakia
- Netherlands
- Romania

== Final ranking ==
Place	Team
1st place, gold medalist(s)	Soviet Union
2nd place, silver medalist(s)	Poland
3rd place, bronze medalist(s)	Yugoslavia
4.	Romania
5.	Bulgaria
6.	Czechoslovakia
7.	East Germany
8.	France
9.	Netherlands
10.	Italy
11.	Hungary
12.	Belgium

1975 Men's European champions

Soviet Union
Fifth title
