= Yury Panchenko =

Ukrainian volleyball player

Personal information
- Full name: Yuriy Petrovych Panchenko
- Nickname: Юрій Петрович Панченко
- Nationality: Russian, Ukrainian
- Born: February 5, 1959 (age 67) Kiev, Ukrainian SSR, Soviet Union
- Height: 1.98 m (6 ft 6 in)

Volleyball information
- Position: Opposite
- Number: 1

National team
- Years: Team
- 1979–1988: Soviet Union
Honours
Men's volleyball
Representing Soviet Union
Olympic Games
Gold medal – first place	1980 Moscow	Team
Silver medal – second place	1988 Seoul	Team
World Championship
Gold medal – first place	1982 Argentina
Silver medal – second place	1986 France	Team
World Cup
Gold medal – first place	1981 Japan
Silver medal – second place	1985 Japan
Goodwill Games
Gold medal – first place	1986 Moscow
Friendship Games
Gold medal – first place	1984 Havana
European Championship
Gold medal – first place	1979 France
Gold medal – first place	1981 Bulgaria
Gold medal – first place	1983 East Germany
Gold medal – first place	1985 Netherlands
Gold medal – first place	1987 Belgium

Yuriy Petrovych Panchenko (Ukrainian: Юрій Петрович Панченко, born 5 February 1959) is a Ukrainian-born Russian coach and former volleyball player who competed for the Soviet Union in the 1980 Summer Olympics in Moscow and the 1988 Summer Olympics in Seoul.

== Career ==
Born in Kiev, Panchenko debuted for Lokomotiv Kiev and, aged twenty, he moved to Soviet Union's most renowned team, VC CSKA Moscow: with this team he won nine Soviet championships, three Soviet Cups, six European Champions Cups (1982, 1983, 1986, 1987, 1988, 1989), and two European Supercups (1987 and 1988). In 1980, he was part of the Soviet team which won the gold medal in the Olympic tournament. He also won the world title in Argentina in 1982.

Eight years later, Panchenko won the silver medal with the Soviet team in the 1988 Olympic tournament. In 1989, he was the first Soviet military allowed to play in a foreign country, when he moved to Conad Ravenna in Italy. The following year Panchenko moved to Moka Rica Forlì, where he remained until ending his career in 1994.
