= East Germany men's national volleyball team =

Men's national volleyball team representing East Germany

East Germany
- Association: Deutscher Sportverband Volleyball der DDR
- Confederation: CEV
- FIVB ranking: NR (15 October 2026)

Uniforms
Home	Away	Third

Summer Olympics
- Appearances: 2 (First in 1968)
- Best result: Runners-up, 1972

World Championship
- Appearances: 7 (First in 1956)
- Best result: (gold) Champions, 1970

European Championship
- Appearances: 10 (First in 1958)
- Best result: 4th Place, 1967, 1971

East Germany men's national volleyball team
Medal record

Olympic Games
Silver medal – second place	1972 Munich	Team

World Championship
Gold medal – first place	1970 Bulgaria	Team

World Cup
Gold medal – first place	1969 East Germany	Team

The East Germany men's national volleyball team was to 1990 the national team of East Germany. It was governed by the Deutscher Sportverband Volleyball der DDR and took part in international volleyball competitions.

After German reunification became a part of United Germany national team.

== Competitive record ==
Champions 2nd Place 3rd Place

=== Summer Olympics ===
Summer Olympics record
Year	Qualifications	Result
(Japan) 1964	Did not qualify	
(Mexico) 1968	Promotion	4th Place
(West Germany) 1972	Promotion	2nd Place
(Canada) 1976	Did not qualify	
(Soviet Union) 1980	Did not qualify	
(United States) 1984	Did not qualify	
(South Korea) 1988	Did not qualify	

=== FIVB World Championship ===
FIVB World Championship record
Year	Qualifications	Result
(Czech Republic) 1949	Did not enter	
(Soviet Union) 1952	Did not enter	
(France) 1956	-	12th Place
(Brazil) 1960	Did not enter	
(Soviet Union) 1962	-	11th Place
(Czech Republic) 1966	Promotion	4th Place
(Bulgaria) 1970	Promotion	Champions
(Mexico) 1974	Promotion	4th Place
(Italy) 1978	Promotion	9th Place
(Argentina) 1982	Promotion	12th Place
(France) 1986	Did not qualify	
(Brazil) 1990	Did not qualify	

=== European Championship ===
European Championship record
Year	Qualifications	Result
(Italy) 1948	Did not enter	
(Bulgaria) 1950	Did not enter	
(France) 1951	Did not enter	
(Romania) 1955	Did not enter	
(Czech Republic) 1958	-	9th Place
(Romania) 1963	-	9th Place
(Turkey) 1967	-	4th Place
(Italy) 1971	-	4th Place
(Socialist Federal Republic of Yugoslavia) 1975	Promotion	7th Place
(Finland) 1977	Promotion	9th Place
(France) 1979	Promotion	9th Place
(Bulgaria) 1981	Promotion	6th Place
(East Germany) 1983	Host	6th Place
(Netherlands) 1985	Did not qualify	
(Belgium) 1987	Did not qualify	
(Sweden) 1989	Promotion	9th Place

== Coaches history ==
Name	From	To	Honours
Herbert Gabriel	1951	1952	–
Werner Brock	1953	1954	–
Gerhard Feck	1955	1955	–
Fritz Döring	1955	1957	–
Helmut Hampel	1957	1958	–
Fritz Döring	1959	1959	–
Herbert Jenter	1960	1974	1972 Olympics Runners-up, 1970 World Champions, 1969 World Cup Winner
Kurt Radde	1975	1978	–
Herbert Jenter	1979	1980	–
Lothar Schröter	1981	1983	–
Bernd Walther	1984	1986	–
Rolf Hornschuch	1987	1987	–
Ulrich Sernow	1988	1990	–

== See also ==
- Germany men's national volleyball team
