= Hungary men's national volleyball team =

Men's national volleyball team representing Hungary

Hungary
- Association: Magyar Röplabda Szövetség
- Confederation: CEV
- Head coach: Péter Nagy

Uniforms
Home	Away

Summer Olympics
- Appearances: 1
- www.hunvolley.hu
Honours
European Championship
Silver medal – second place	1963 Romania	Team
Bronze medal – third place	1950 Bulgaria	Team

The Hungary men's national volleyball team is the national team of Hungary. It is governed by the Magyar Röplabda Szövetség and takes part in international volleyball competitions. Hungary won two medals in Men's European Volleyball Championship.

== Results ==
2026 Men's European Volleyball Championship qualification

=== Olympic Games ===
Volleyball at the 1964 Summer Olympics – Men's tournament

Czechoslovakia 3–2 Hungary

Hungary 3–0 Japan

Hungary 3–0 United States

- 1964 — 6th place
- 1968 — did not qualify
- 1972 — did not qualify
- 1976 — did not qualify
- 1980 — did not qualify
- 1984 — did not participate
- 1988 — did not qualify
- 1992 — did not qualify
- 1996 — did not qualify
- 2000 — did not qualify
- 2004 — did not qualify
- 2008 — did not qualify
- 2012 — did not qualify
- 2016 — did not qualify
- 2020 — did not qualify
- 2024 — did not qualify

Year	Result	Pld	W	L	SW	SL	PW	PL
(Japan) 1964	6th place	9	4	5	0	0	0	0
(Mexico) 1968	th place	0	0	0	0	0	0	0
(West Germany) 1972	th place	0	0	0	0	0	0	0
(Canada) 1976	th place	0	0	0	0	0	0	0
(Soviet Union) 1980	th place	0	0	0	0	0	0	0
(United States) 1984	th place	0	0	0	0	0	0	0
(South Korea) 1988	th place	0	0	0	0	0	0	0
(Spain) 1992	th place	0	0	0	0	0	0	0
(United States) 1996	th place	0	0	0	0	0	0	0
(Australia) 2000	th place	0	0	0	0	0	0	0
(Greece) 2004	th place	0	0	0	0	0	0	0
(China) 2008	th place	0	0	0	0	0	0	0
(United Kingdom) 2012	th place	0	0	0	0	0	0	0
(Brazil) 2016	th place	0	0	0	0	0	0	0
(Japan) 2020	th place	0	0	0	0	0	0	0
(France) 2024	th place	0	0	0	0	0	0	0
Total	1/16	0	0	0	0	0	0	0

=== World Championship ===
- 1949 — 7th place
- 1952 — 5th place
- 1956 — 8th place
- 1960 — 6th place
- 1962 — 7th place
- 1966 — 10th place
- 1970 — 11th place
- 1974 — did not qualify
- 1978 — 14th place
- 1982 — did not qualify
- 1986 — did not qualify
- 1990 — did not qualify
- 1994 — did not qualify
- 1998 — did not qualify
- 2002 — did not qualify
- 2006 — did not qualify
- 2010 — did not qualify
- 2014 — did not qualify
- 2018 — did not qualify
- 2022 — did not qualify
- 2025 — did not qualify

Year	Result	Pld	W	L	SW	SL	PW	PL
(Czechoslovakia) 1949	th place	0	0	0	0	0	0	0
(Soviet Union) 1952	th place	0	0	0	0	0	0	0
(France) 1956	th place	0	0	0	0	0	0	0
(Brazil) 1960	th place	0	0	0	0	0	0	0
(Soviet Union) 1962	th place	0	0	0	0	0	0	0
(Czechoslovakia) 1966	th place	0	0	0	0	0	0	0
(Bulgaria) 1970	th place	0	0	0	0	0	0	0
(Mexico) 1974	th place	0	0	0	0	0	0	0
(Italy) 1978	th place	0	0	0	0	0	0	0
(Argentina) 1982	th place	0	0	0	0	0	0	0
(France) 1986	th place	0	0	0	0	0	0	0
(Brazil) 1990	th place	0	0	0	0	0	0	0
(Greece) 1994	th place	0	0	0	0	0	0	0
(Japan) 1998	th place	0	0	0	0	0	0	0
(Argentina) 2002	th place	0	0	0	0	0	0	0
(Japan) 2006	th place	0	0	0	0	0	0	0
(Italy) 2010	th place	0	0	0	0	0	0	0
(Poland) 2014	th place	0	0	0	0	0	0	0
(Italy) (Bulgaria) 2018	th place	0	0	0	0	0	0	0
(Poland) (Slovenia) 2022	th place	0	0	0	0	0	0	0
(Philippines) 2025	th place	0	0	0	0	0	0	0
Total	0/21	0	0	0	0	0	0	0

=== European Championship ===
Men's European Volleyball Championship

- 1948 — did not qualify
- 1950 — 3rd place
- 1951 — did not qualify
- 1955 — 7th place
- 1958 — 5th place
- 1963 — 2nd place
- 1967 — 6th place
- 1971 — 5th place
- 1975 — 11th place
- 1977 — 4th place
- 1979 — 8th place
- 1981 — did not qualify
- 1983 — 11th place
- 1985 — did not qualify
- 1987 — did not qualify
- 1989 — did not qualify
- 1991 — did not qualify
- 1993 — did not qualify
- 1995 — did not qualify
- 1997 — did not qualify
- 1999 — did not qualify
- 2001 — 9th place (tied)
- 2003 — did not qualify
- 2005 — did not qualify
- 2007 — did not qualify
- 2009 — did not qualify
- 2011 — did not qualify
- 2013 — did not qualify
- 2015 — did not qualify
- 2017 — did not qualify
- 2019 — did not qualify
- 2021 — did not qualify
- 2023 — did not qualify
- 2026 — did not qualify

=== European Volleyball League ===
- 2013 — 12th place
- 2017 — 6th place
- 2018 — 19th place
- 2019 — 17th place (tied)
- 2021 — 14th place
- 2022 — 15th place
- 2025 — 14th place
- 2026 — 11th place

=== World League ===
- did not compete

== Players ==
- Sándor Cséfay (1946–1947)
- József Spányik (1947)
- László Bizik (1947)
- József Abád (1948)
- László Machacsek (1949)
- Spányik József (1949)
- Bieliczki István (1950)
- Abád József (1951)
- Prohászka László (1952–1953)
- Abád József (1954–1956)
- Prohászka László (1957)
- Abád József (1957–1962)
- Porubszky László (1963–1966)
- Prohászka László (1967–1969)
- Hennig Ernő (1970–1973)
- Juni György (1974)
- Tarnawa Ferdinánd (1974–1975)
- Garamvölgyi Mátyás (1975–1983)
- Róka Gaszton (1984–1985)
- Mihály Tatár (1985)
- Ferenc Botos (1985–1987)
- Sándor Péter (1987–1990)
- Botos Ferenc (1990–1991)
- Lajos Németh (1992–1995)
- Garamvölgyi Mátyás (1996)
- Nyári Sándor (1996–2001)
- György Demeter (2001–2007)
- Sándor Kántor (2008–2011)
- István Kelemen (2012)
- György Demeter (2013–2016)
- Juan Manuel Barrial (2017)
- Bogdan Tanase (2018–2019)
- Róbert Koch (2020–)

== See also ==
- Hungary women's national volleyball team
