= Włodzimierz Nalazek =

Polish volleyball player (born 1957)

Personal information
- Born: 10 April 1957 (age 69) Warsaw, Poland
- Height: 2.00 m (6 ft 7 in)

Sport
- Sport: Volleyball
Medal record
Men's volleyball
Representing Poland
Friendship Games
Bronze medal – third place	1984 Havana
European Championship
Silver medal – second place	1979 France
Silver medal – second place	1981 Bulgaria
Silver medal – second place	1983 East Germany

Włodzimierz Nalazek (born 10 April 1957) is a Polish former volleyball player. He competed in the men's tournament at the 1980 Summer Olympics.

== Biography ==
Włodzimierz Nalaze graduated the Colonel Henryk Leliwa-Roycewicz Sports School Complex No. 70.

He players for KS Orzeł, MDK, Legia, AZS Worsaw, AZS Olsztyn. He played 278 matches for the Polish national team between 1978 and 1985. Three-time silver medallist of the European Championships in Paris in 1979, Sofia in 1981, Berlin in 1983. Participant of 1978 FIVB Volleyball Men's World Championship in Rome, where Poland took 8th place, and in 1982 in Buenos Aires, where Poland took 6th place. Participated in the 1981 World Cup in Tokyo, where the Polish team took 4th place.

At the 1980 Olympic Games, he was a member of the team that took fourth place.
