= 2028 Men's European Volleyball Championship =

2028 Evropsko prvenstvo u odbojci (Montenegrin)

Tournament details
- Host countries: Montenegro (N/A) (N/A) (N/A)
- Dates: 2028
- Teams: 24
- Venue: TBD (in TBD host cities)

The 2028 Men's European Volleyball Championship, commonly referred to as EuroVolley Men 2028, will be the 35th edition of the biannual continental tournament for men's national volleyball teams, organised by Europe's governing volleyball body, CEV. The tournament will be held in 2028. It will be organised in Montenegro and three yet to be known countries, marking the fifth consecutive time EuroVolley will be held in four countries, after the multi-country hosting system was first used in 2019.

24 teams will participate for the fifth time as well. Qualification took place in June 2026 to July 2027. The four co-hosts qualified automatically.

This will be the second European Championship after 2026 to be held in an even-numbered year.

Poland are the defending champions, having won two consecutive titles at the 2023 and 2026 tournaments.

The top three finishers will also qualify for the 2029 FIVB Men's Volleyball World Cup in Qatar.

== Bidding process ==
On 4 July 2025, the bidding process was started.

=== Hosting requirements ===
==== Venue requirements ====
Rounds	Capacity
Group stage, Eight-finals & Quarterfinals	5,000
Semifinals & Final	10,000

==== Organisation fees ====
Rounds	Price
Group stage	€650,000
Group stage, Eight-finals & Quarterfinals	€1,2 million
Group stage, Eight-finals, Quarterfinals, Semifinals & Final	€2 million

=== Host selection ===
- Montenegro – On 31 March 2025, the minister of sports, Dragoslav Šćekić, expressed Montenegro's interest in hosting the event with their Croatia, Hungary and Serbia. Deputy prime minister, Aleksa Bačić, said he supports the idea of hosting. Montenegro became the first host of the tournament, being given the hosting rights on 6 March 2026. This is Montenegro's first time ever organizing the event.

=== Interested applicants ===
- Croatia – Croatia expressed interest in 2024. In April 2025, the president of the Croatian Volleyball Federation Frane Žanić supported the bid.If selected, this would be Croatia's first time organizing the event.
- Hungary On 31 March 2025, Hungary expressed interest to host. If selected, this would be Hungary's first time organizing the event.
- Latvia on 22 January 2026 while Montenegrin prime minister Milojko Spajić who supported his country's bid, he suggested that Latvia could host matches. If selected, this would be Latvia's first time organizing the event.
- Serbia In April 2025, Serbia joined bid to host. If selected, this would be Serbia's first time hosting as an independent nation, although hosted in 1975 under Yugoslavia and 2005 under Serbia and Montenegro.

== Qualification ==
24 teams qualify for the championship. For the first time since the 1971 edition, there will be no qualification tournament and teams will earn slots in the tournament through different methods. The four co-hosts and the defending champions from the 2026 edition automatically progress (in the event that a host nation has already qualified via another pathway, its host slot cascades to the European Ranking for national teams as of 2027, and in case the defending champions has already qualified via another pathway, its slot goes to the next best team not yet qualified from the 2026 edition).

For the first time, Men's European Volleyball League will serve as a qualifier for the tournament. The semifinalists from the 2026 and 2027 editions will qualify for the tournament (in case a qualified team occupies a slot, it goes to the next best team not yet qualified from the European League).

The remaining 11 slots will be allocated to the highest-ranked teams not yet qualified according to the European Ranking for national teams at the end of the 2027 European League and 2027 FIVB Nations League.

Means of qualification	Qualifier	Means of qualification	Qualifier
Host Countries	Montenegro	Defending champions	Poland
Host Countries	(N/A)	European Ranking	(N/A)
Host Countries	(N/A)	European Ranking	(N/A)
Host Countries	(N/A)	European Ranking	(N/A)
2026 European League	Finland	European Ranking	(N/A)
2026 European League	Netherlands	European Ranking	(N/A)
2026 European League	Denmark	European Ranking	(N/A)
2026 European League	Israel	European Ranking	(N/A)
2027 European League	(N/A)	European Ranking	(N/A)
2027 European League	(N/A)	European Ranking	(N/A)
2027 European League	(N/A)	European Ranking	(N/A)
2027 European League	(N/A)	European Ranking	(N/A)
Total 24

=== Summary of qualified teams ===
Team	Qualification method	Date of qualification	Appearance(s)				Previous best performance (Note: Bold text indicates they hosted that edition.)	WR (Note: At the start of the tournament.)
Team	Qualification method	Date of qualification	Total	First	Last	Streak	Previous best performance	WR
Montenegro	Host nation	6 March 2026	4th	2019	2023	1	18th place (2019)	TBD
(N/A)	Host nation							TBD
(N/A)	Host nation							TBD
(N/A)	Host nation							TBD
Denmark	2026 European League semifinalists	20 June 2026	7th	1958	2026	3	12th place (**2013**)	TBD
Netherlands	2026 European League semifinalists	21 June 2026	30th	1948	2026	8	**Champions** (**1997**)	TBD
Israel	2026 European League semifinalists	21 June 2026	6th	1951	2026	3	10th place (1951)	TBD
Finland	2026 European League semifinalists	21 June 2026	22nd	1955	2026	11	3rd place (**2026**)	TBD
Poland	Defending champions	27 September 2026	30th	1950	2026	14	**Champions** (2009, 2023, 2026)	TBD
(N/A)	2027 European League semifinalists							TBD
(N/A)	2027 European League semifinalists							TBD
(N/A)	2027 European League semifinalists							TBD
(N/A)	2027 European League semifinalists							TBD
(N/A)	European highest-ranked non-qualified team							TBD
(N/A)	European highest-ranked non-qualified team							TBD
(N/A)	European highest-ranked non-qualified team							TBD
(N/A)	European highest-ranked non-qualified team							TBD
(N/A)	European highest-ranked non-qualified team							TBD
(N/A)	European highest-ranked non-qualified team							TBD
(N/A)	European highest-ranked non-qualified team							TBD
(N/A)	European highest-ranked non-qualified team							TBD
(N/A)	European highest-ranked non-qualified team							TBD
(N/A)	European highest-ranked non-qualified team							TBD
(N/A)	European highest-ranked non-qualified team							TBD

== Venues ==
So far one venue in one cities has been revealed to host the tournament.

=== Overview of venues ===
==== Montenegro ====
- One Montenegrin venue will be used during the tournament. The Morača Sports Center in Podgorica will host the group phase.

== Final standing ==
Rank	Team
1st place, gold medalist(s)	
2nd place, silver medalist(s)	
3rd place, bronze medalist(s)	
4	
5	
6	
7	
8	
9	
10	
11	
12	
13	
14	
15	
16	
17	
18	
19	
20	
21	
22	
23	
24	

Qualified for the 2029 World Cup
Qualified for the 2029 World Cup via FIVB World Ranking
