= 1966 FIVB Men's Volleyball World Championship =

1966 FIVB World Championship
Tournament details
- Host country: Czechoslovakia
- Dates: 30 August – 11 September
- Teams: 22
- Venues: 5 (in 5 host cities)
- Officially opened by: Antonín Novotný

Final positions
- Champions: Czechoslovakia (2nd title)

The 1966 FIVB Men's World Championship was the sixth edition of the tournament, organised by the world's governing body, the FIVB. It was held from 30 August to 11 September 1966 in Czechoslovakia.

== Qualification ==
For the first time the teams were restricted to 24. First 12 teams from 1962 World Championship (including host country) and 3 teams from each continent (Europe, Asia, America and Africa) were qualified to 1966 edition.

Means of qualification	Date	Host	Vacancies	Qualified
Host country	—N/a	—N/a	1	Czechoslovakia
1962 FIVB Men's Volleyball World Championship	12–26 October 1962	Soviet Union	11	Soviet Union
1962 FIVB Men's Volleyball World Championship	12–26 October 1962	Soviet Union	11	Romania
1962 FIVB Men's Volleyball World Championship	12–26 October 1962	Soviet Union	11	Bulgaria
1962 FIVB Men's Volleyball World Championship	12–26 October 1962	Soviet Union	11	Japan
1962 FIVB Men's Volleyball World Championship	12–26 October 1962	Soviet Union	11	Poland
1962 FIVB Men's Volleyball World Championship	12–26 October 1962	Soviet Union	11	Hungary
1962 FIVB Men's Volleyball World Championship	12–26 October 1962	Soviet Union	11	Yugoslavia
1962 FIVB Men's Volleyball World Championship	12–26 October 1962	Soviet Union	11	China
1962 FIVB Men's Volleyball World Championship	12–26 October 1962	Soviet Union	11	Brazil
1962 FIVB Men's Volleyball World Championship	12–26 October 1962	Soviet Union	11	East Germany
1962 FIVB Men's Volleyball World Championship	12–26 October 1962	Soviet Union	11	Netherlands
1963 Men's European Volleyball Championship	21 Oct – 2 Nov 1963	Romania	5	France
1963 Men's European Volleyball Championship	21 Oct – 2 Nov 1963	Romania	5	Italy
1963 Men's European Volleyball Championship	21 Oct – 2 Nov 1963	Romania	5	Turkey
1963 Men's European Volleyball Championship	21 Oct – 2 Nov 1963	Romania	5	Belgium*
1963 Men's European Volleyball Championship	21 Oct – 2 Nov 1963	Romania	5	Finland*
Volleyball at the 1963 Pan American Games	24 Apr – 3 May 1963	(Brazil) São Paulo	~~3~~; 2	United States
Volleyball at the 1963 Pan American Games	24 Apr – 3 May 1963	(Brazil) São Paulo	~~3~~; 2	~~Argentina~~*
Volleyball at the 1963 Pan American Games	24 Apr – 3 May 1963	(Brazil) São Paulo	~~3~~; 2	~~Mexico~~; Cuba*
Asian Qualifier	Unknown	Unknown	~~3~~; 2	~~North Korea~~*
Asian Qualifier	Unknown	Unknown	~~3~~; 2	Mongolia
Asian Qualifier	Unknown	Unknown	~~3~~; 2	~~Israel~~; Denmark*
African Qualifier	Unknown	Unknown	1	~~Morocco~~; West Germany*
Total			~~24~~ 22	

* Only Morocco from Africa confirmed participation, Belgium and Finland replaced the other African teams. Mexico, Israel and Morocco were replaced by Cuba, Denmark and West Germany. Also Argentina and North Korea did not arrive for the Championship but there were no more European teams to replace them.

== Venues ==
Pool A and Final round	Pool B	1966 FIVB Men's Volleyball World Championship (Czechoslovakia)
Prague, Czechoslovakia	Nitra, Czechoslovakia	1966 FIVB Men's Volleyball World Championship (Czechoslovakia)
Pool C	Pool D	1966 FIVB Men's Volleyball World Championship (Czechoslovakia)
České Budějovice, Czechoslovakia	Jihlava, Czechoslovakia	1966 FIVB Men's Volleyball World Championship (Czechoslovakia)
Final round		1966 FIVB Men's Volleyball World Championship (Czechoslovakia)
Pardubice, Czechoslovakia		1966 FIVB Men's Volleyball World Championship (Czechoslovakia)

== Results ==
=== First round ===
==== Pool A ====
Location: Prague

Pos	Team	Pld	W	L	Pts	SW	SL	SR	SPW	SPL	SPR	Qualification
1	Czechoslovakia	5	5	0	10	15	3	5.000	260	143	1.818	Final places
2	Yugoslavia	5	4	1	9	13	4	3.250	246	162	1.519	Final places
3	China	5	3	2	8	12	6	2.000	255	138	1.848	9th–16th places
4	Italy	5	2	3	7	6	10	0.600	133	203	0.655	9th–16th places
5	West Germany	5	1	4	6	4	12	0.333	122	202	0.604	17th–22nd places
6	Denmark	5	0	5	5	0	15	0.000	57	225	0.253	17th–22nd places

Date	Time		Score		Set 1	Set 2	Set 3	Set 4	Set 5	Total
30 Aug	15:00	Czechoslovakia	3–1	Yugoslavia	15–8	11–15	18–16	15–13		59–52
30 Aug		China	3–0	Italy	15–3	15–3	15–0			45–6
30 Aug		West Germany	3–0	Denmark	15–3	15–2	15–7			45–12
31 Aug	15:00	Yugoslavia	3–0	West Germany	15–4	15–3	15–11			45–18
31 Aug		Czechoslovakia	3–2	China	12–15	8–15	15–11	16–14	15–11	66–66
31 Aug		Italy	3–0	Denmark	15–10	15–3	15–9			45–22
1 Sep	15:00	Czechoslovakia	3–0	West Germany	15–3	15–1	15–5			45–9
1 Sep		Yugoslavia	3–0	Italy	15–8	15–5	15–4			45–17
1 Sep		China	3–0	Denmark	15–0	15–2	15–1			45–3
2 Sep	15:00	Yugoslavia	3–0	Denmark	15–4	15–2	15–8			45–14
2 Sep		Czechoslovakia	3–0	Italy	15–7	15–2	15–1			45–10
2 Sep		China	3–0	West Germany	15–0	15–2	15–2			45–4
3 Sep	15:00	Czechoslovakia	3–0	Denmark	15–2	15–3	15–1			45–6
3 Sep		Yugoslavia	3–1	China	15–12	15–13	13–15	16–14		59–54
3 Sep		Italy	3–1	West Germany	15–12	15–7	10–15	15–12		55–46

==== Pool B ====
Location: Nitra

Pos	Team	Pld	W	L	Pts	SW	SL	SR	SPW	SPL	SPR	Qualification
1	Soviet Union	5	4	1	9	14	4	3.500	260	170	1.529	Final places
2	East Germany	5	4	1	9	12	3	4.000	199	114	1.746	Final places
3	Hungary	5	4	1	9	12	8	1.500	258	232	1.112	9th–16th places
4	United States	5	2	3	7	8	11	0.727	214	251	0.853	9th–16th places
5	Cuba	5	1	4	6	5	14	0.357	199	263	0.757	17th–22nd places
6	France	5	0	5	5	4	15	0.267	164	264	0.621	17th–22nd places

Date	Time		Score		Set 1	Set 2	Set 3	Set 4	Set 5	Total
30 Aug	15:00	Soviet Union	3–1	United States	13–15	15–8	15–6	15–9		58–38
30 Aug	18:00	Cuba	3–2	France	15–13	6–15	13–15	15–7	15–6	64–56
30 Aug		East Germany	3–0	Hungary	15–5	15–13	15–6			45–24
31 Aug	15:00	Hungary	3–1	Cuba	13–15	15–10	15–1	15–10		58–36
31 Aug	18:00	East Germany	3–0	United States	15–5	15–5	15–5			45–15
31 Aug		Soviet Union	3–0	France	15–10	15–10	15–3			45–23
1 Sep	15:00	East Germany	3–0	France	15–2	15–3	15–3			45–8
1 Sep	18:00	Soviet Union	3–0	Cuba	15–13	15–5	15–8			45–26
1 Sep		Hungary	3–1	United States	17–15	11–15	15–3	15–13		58–46
2 Sep	15:00	United States	3–1	Cuba	13–15	16–14	15–12	15–10		59–51
2 Sep	18:00	Hungary	3–1	France	9–15	15–11	15–8	15–4		54–38
2 Sep		Soviet Union	3–0	East Germany	15–8	15–9	15–2			45–19
3 Sep	15:00	United States	3–1	France	11–15	15–3	15–12	15–9		56–39
3 Sep	18:00	East Germany	3–0	Cuba	15–11	15–4	15–7			45–22
3 Sep	18:00	Hungary	3–2	Soviet Union	6–15	15–13	13–15	15–11	15–13	64–67

==== Pool C ====
Location: České Budějovice

Pos	Team	Pld	W	L	Pts	SW	SL	SR	SPW	SPL	SPR	Qualification
1	Poland	4	4	0	8	12	3	4.000	211	121	1.744	Final places
2	Romania	4	3	1	7	11	4	2.750	210	120	1.750	Final places
3	Netherlands	4	2	2	6	8	6	1.333	146	177	0.825	9th–16th places
4	Turkey	4	1	3	5	3	10	0.300	113	178	0.635	9th–16th places
5	Mongolia	4	0	4	4	1	12	0.083	103	187	0.551	17th–22nd places

Date	Time		Score		Set 1	Set 2	Set 3	Set 4	Set 5	Total
30 Aug	18:00	Netherlands	3–0	Turkey	15–9	15–13	15–11			45–33
30 Aug		Poland	3–2	Romania	6–15	12–15	15–13	16–14	15–5	64–62
31 Aug	18:00	Turkey	3–1	Mongolia	15–9	15–9	7–15	15–10		52–43
31 Aug		Romania	3–1	Netherlands	15–7	15–4	13–15	15–1		58–27
1 Sep	18:00	Romania	3–0	Mongolia	15–3	15–8	15–5			45–16
1 Sep		Poland	3–1	Netherlands	15–5	15–1	12–15	15–8		57–29
2 Sep	18:00	Netherlands	3–0	Mongolia	15–12	15–7	15–10			45–29
2 Sep		Poland	3–0	Turkey	15–6	15–2	15–7			45–15
3 Sep	18:00	Romania	3–0	Turkey	15–4	15–2	15–7			45–13
3 Sep		Poland	3–0	Mongolia	15–8	15–5	15–2			45–15

==== Pool D ====
Location: Jihlava

Pos	Team	Pld	W	L	Pts	SW	SL	SR	SPW	SPL	SPR	Qualification
1	Japan	4	4	0	8	12	2	6.000	201	124	1.621	Final places
2	Bulgaria	4	3	1	7	11	4	2.750	210	136	1.544	Final places
3	Brazil	4	2	2	6	6	6	1.000	144	130	1.108	9th–16th places
4	Belgium	4	1	3	5	4	11	0.364	134	205	0.654	9th–16th places
5	Finland	4	0	4	4	2	12	0.167	101	195	0.518	17th–22nd places

Date	Time		Score		Set 1	Set 2	Set 3	Set 4	Set 5	Total
30 Aug	18:00	Bulgaria	3–0	Brazil	15–13	15–13	15–7			45–33
30 Aug		Belgium	3–2	Finland	15–9	6–15	15–9	9–15	15–8	60–56
31 Aug	18:00	Brazil	3–0	Belgium	15–7	15–11	15–7			45–25
31 Aug		Japan	3–2	Bulgaria	10–15	9–15	15–12	15–9	15–12	64–63
1 Sep	18:00	Bulgaria	3–0	Finland	15–5	15–7	15–3			45–15
1 Sep		Japan	3–0	Brazil	15–10	15–8	15–3			45–21
2 Sep	18:00	Bulgaria	3–1	Belgium	12–15	15–4	15–2	15–3		57–24
2 Sep		Japan	3–0	Finland	15–2	15–6	15–7			45–15
3 Sep	18:00	Brazil	3–0	Finland	15–5	15–3	15–7			45–15
3 Sep		Japan	3–0	Belgium	15–3	17–15	15–7			47–25

=== Final round ===
The results and the points of the matches between the same teams that were already played during the first round are taken into account for the final round.

==== 17th–22nd places ====
Location: Prague

Pos	Team	Pld	W	L	Pts	SW	SL	SR	SPW	SPL	SPR
17	Cuba	5	5	0	10	15	2	7.500	245	149	1.644
18	France	5	4	1	9	14	0	MAX	0	0	—
19	Finland	5	3	2	8	11	8	1.375	236	221	1.068
20	West Germany	5	2	3	7	8	9	0.889	187	201	0.930
21	Mongolia	5	1	4	6	0	13	0.000	0	0	—
22	Denmark	5	0	5	5	1	15	0.067	0	0	—

Source: https://www.les-sports.info/volleyball-championnat-du-monde-hommes-1966-epr22865.html

Date	Time		Score		Set 1	Set 2	Set 3	Set 4	Set 5	Total
5 Sep	09:30	France	3–0	West Germany	15–6	15–9	15–5			45–20
5 Sep		Cuba	3–0	Finland	15–8	15–10	15–10			45–28
6 Sep	09:30	Mongolia	3–1	Denmark	15-17	15-9	15-13	15-9		60-48
6 Sep		France	3–2	Finland	10–15	6–15	15–13	15–9	15–3	61–55
7 Sep	09:30	Cuba	3–0	Denmark	15–9	15–9	16–14			46–32
7 Sep		West Germany	3–0	Mongolia	15–13	15–13	15–10			45–36
9 Sep	08:30	Finland	3–2	West Germany	6–15	15–12	15–11	12–15	15–11	63–64
9 Sep	10:30	France	3–0	Denmark	15–8	15–7	15–3			45–18
9 Sep		Cuba	3–0	Mongolia	15–6	15–9	15–5			45–20
10 Sep	08:30	France	3–0	Mongolia	15-6	15-9	15-5			45-20
10 Sep		Finland	3–0	Denmark	15–13	15–8	15–4			45–25
11 Sep	08:30	Cuba	3–0	West Germany	15–3	15–7	15–3			45–13
11 Sep		Finland	3–0	Mongolia	15–5	15–13	15–8			45–26

==== 9th–16th places ====
Location: Pardubice

Pos	Team	Pld	W	L	Pts	SW	SL	SR	SPW	SPL	SPR
9	China	7	7	0	14	21	5	4.200	368	224	1.643
10	Hungary	7	6	1	13	20	6	3.333	364	275	1.324
11	United States	7	4	3	11	16	12	1.333	366	314	1.166
12	Netherlands	7	4	3	11	14	12	1.167	312	329	0.948
13	Brazil	7	3	4	10	13	12	1.083	318	294	1.082
14	Belgium	7	3	4	10	11	15	0.733	315	331	0.952
15	Turkey	7	1	6	8	4	19	0.211	208	319	0.652
16	Italy	7	0	7	7	3	21	0.143	194	359	0.540

Date	Time		Score		Set 1	Set 2	Set 3	Set 4	Set 5	Total
5 Sep		Belgium	3–1	Turkey	13–15	15–5	15–5	15–13		58–38
5 Sep		United States	3–1	Netherlands	5–15	15–3	15–13	15–8		50–39
5 Sep		China	3–1	Brazil	15–12	15–13	11–15	15–4		56–44
5 Sep		Hungary	3–0	Italy	15–7	15–6	15–12			45–25
6 Sep	13:30	China	3–0	Turkey	15–3	15–5	15–8			45–16
6 Sep		Brazil	3–0	Italy	15–6	15–5	16–14			46–25
6 Sep	19:00	Hungary	3–1	Netherlands	15–8	15–10	14–16	15–13		59–47
6 Sep		Belgium	3–1	United States	11–15	15–10	15–12	15–12		56–49
7 Sep	13:30	Netherlands	3–1	Belgium	16–14	15–10	7–15	15–12		53–51
7 Sep		Hungary	3–0	Brazil	15–9	15–5	16–14			46–28
7 Sep	19:00	China	3–2	United States	12–15	16–14	9–15	15–7	15–11	67–62
7 Sep		Turkey	3–1	Italy	15–5	14–16	15–13	15–2		59–36
9 Sep	13:30	Hungary	3–1	Belgium	15–13	11–15	15–9	15–11		56–48
9 Sep		United States	3–1	Italy	15–5	15–3	14–16	15–4		59–28
9 Sep	19:00	China	3–0	Netherlands	15–4	15–6	16–14			46–24
9 Sep		Brazil	3–0	Turkey	15–6	15–10	15–12			45–28
10 Sep	13:30	Hungary	3–0	Turkey	15–4	15–6	15–7			45–17
10 Sep		Netherlands	3–0	Italy	15–11	15–11	15–7			45–29
10 Sep	19:00	China	3–0	Belgium	15–11	15–2	15–4			45–17
10 Sep		United States	3–1	Brazil	15–12	15–12	10–15	15–10		55–49
11 Sep	09:00	Belgium	3–1	Italy	15–6	15–9	14–16	16–14		60–45
11 Sep		United States	3–0	Turkey	15–5	15–8	15–4			45–17
11 Sep	13:00	China	3–2	Hungary	15–9	15–5	11–15	8–15	15–11	64–55
11 Sep		Netherlands	3–2	Brazil	15–9	9–15	5–15	15–10	15–12	59–61

==== Final places ====
Location: Pardubice

Pos	Team	Pld	W	L	Pts	SW	SL	SR	SPW	SPL	SPR
1	Czechoslovakia	7	6	1	13	20	9	2.222	400	331	1.208
2	Romania	7	5	2	12	18	12	1.500	385	362	1.064
3	Soviet Union	7	4	3	11	18	11	1.636	380	330	1.152
4	East Germany	7	4	3	11	14	12	1.167	306	293	1.044
5	Japan	7	4	3	11	17	17	1.000	385	421	0.914
6	Poland	7	3	4	10	13	17	0.765	353	374	0.944
7	Bulgaria	7	2	5	9	10	17	0.588	323	335	0.964
8	Yugoslavia	7	0	7	7	6	21	0.286	287	373	0.769

Date	Time		Score		Set 1	Set 2	Set 3	Set 4	Set 5	Total
5 Sep	13:30	Romania	3–1	East Germany	15–11	12–15	15–12	15–1		57–39
5 Sep		Japan	3–2	Yugoslavia	15–12	8–15	15–5	6–15	15–13	59–60
5 Sep	19:30	Czechoslovakia	3–2	Soviet Union	14–16	15–12	15–9	8–15	15–4	67–56
5 Sep		Bulgaria	3–2	Poland	5–15	10–15	15–6	15–11	15–11	60–58
6 Sep	13:30	Poland	3–2	Japan	12–15	15–9	7–15	15–8	15–3	64–50
6 Sep		Soviet Union	3–1	Yugoslavia	15–11	15–6	13–15	15–4		58–36
6 Sep	19:30	Czechoslovakia	3–1	Romania	15–11	15–6	12–15	15–8		57–40
6 Sep		East Germany	3–1	Bulgaria	3–15	15–13	15–11	15–8		48–47
7 Sep	13:30	Romania	3–1	Yugoslavia	15–11	16–14	4–15	15–12		50–52
7 Sep		East Germany	3–0	Poland	15–9	15–6	15–4			45–19
7 Sep	19:30	Czechoslovakia	3–0	Bulgaria	15–11	15–13	18–16			48–40
7 Sep		Japan	3–2	Soviet Union	15–12	12–15	4–15	15–7	15–8	61–57
9 Sep	13:30	Bulgaria	3–0	Yugoslavia	15–4	15–8	15–8			45–20
9 Sep		Czechoslovakia	3–1	Poland	15–8	15–12	14–16	15–8		59–44
9 Sep	19:30	Romania	3–2	Soviet Union	15–12	13–15	13–15	15–12	15–10	71–64
9 Sep		East Germany	3–2	Japan	6–15	15–13	12–15	15–5	15–4	63–52
10 Sep	13:30	Romania	3–1	Japan	15–10	15–11	8–15	15–11		53–47
10 Sep		Poland	3–1	Yugoslavia	12–15	15–8	15–12	15–8		57–43
10 Sep	19:00	Soviet Union	3–0	Bulgaria	15–3	15–13	15–13			45–29
10 Sep		Czechoslovakia	3–1	East Germany	15–13	15–11	4–15	15–8		49–47
11 Sep	13:30	Soviet Union	3–1	Poland	15–13	15–11	10–15	15–8		55–47
11 Sep		Romania	3–1	Bulgaria	15–8	15–10	7–15	15–6		52–39
11 Sep		East Germany	3–0	Yugoslavia	15–7	15–12	15–5			45–24
11 Sep		Japan	3–2	Czechoslovakia	6–15	15–9	1–15	15–12	15–10	52–61

== Final standing ==
Rank	Team
1st place, gold medalist(s)	Czechoslovakia
2nd place, silver medalist(s)	Romania
3rd place, bronze medalist(s)	Soviet Union
4	East Germany
5	Japan
6	Poland
7	Bulgaria
8	Yugoslavia
9	China
10	Hungary
11	United States
12	Netherlands
13	Brazil
14	Belgium
15	Turkey
16	Italy
17	Cuba
18	France
19	Finland
20	West Germany
21	Mongolia
22	Denmark

1966 Men's World champions

Czechoslovakia
2nd title
