= Soviet Union men's national volleyball team =

National volleyball team (1948–1991)

Soviet Union
- Association: Soviet Union
- Confederation: CEV
- FIVB ranking: NR (15 October 2026)

Uniforms
Home	Away	Third

Summer Olympics
- Appearances: 6 (First in 1964)
- Best result: (gold) (1964, 1968, 1980)

World Championship
- Appearances: 12 (First in 1949)
- Best result: (gold) (1949, 1952, 1960, 1962, 1978, 1982)

World Cup
- Appearances: 7 (First in 1965)
- Best result: (1965, 1977, 1981, 1991)

European Championship
- Appearances: 16 (First in 1950)
- Best result: (gold) (1950, 1951, 1967, 1971, 1975, 1977, 1979, 1981, 1983, 1985, 1987, 1991)
- www.volley.ru (in Russian)
Honours
Olympic Games
Gold medal – first place	1964 Tokyo	Team
Gold medal – first place	1968 Mexico	Team
Bronze medal – third place	1972 Munich	Team
Silver medal – second place	1976 Montreal	Team
Gold medal – first place	1980 Moscow	Team
Silver medal – second place	1988 Seoul	Team
World Championship
Gold medal – first place	1949 Czechoslovakia
Gold medal – first place	1952 Soviet Union)
Gold medal – first place	1960 Brazil
Gold medal – first place	1962 Soviet Union
Gold medal – first place	1978 Italy
Gold medal – first place	1982 Argentina
Silver medal – second place	1974 Mexico
Silver medal – second place	1986 France
Bronze medal – third place	1956 France
Bronze medal – third place	1966 Czechoslovakia
Bronze medal – third place	1990 Brazil
World Cup
Gold medal – first place	1965 Poland
Gold medal – first place	1977 Japan
Gold medal – first place	1981 Japan
Gold medal – first place	1991 Japan
Silver medal – second place	1985 Japan
Bronze medal – third place	1969 East Germany
Bronze medal – third place	1989 Japan
World League
Bronze medal – third place	1991 Milan
European Championship
Gold medal – first place	1950 Bulgaria
Gold medal – first place	1951 France
Gold medal – first place	1967 Turkey
Gold medal – first place	1971 Italy
Gold medal – first place	1975 Yugoslavia
Gold medal – first place	1977 Finland
Gold medal – first place	1979 France
Gold medal – first place	1981 Bulgaria
Gold medal – first place	1983 East Germany
Gold medal – first place	1985 Netherlands
Gold medal – first place	1987 Belgium
Gold medal – first place	1991 Germany
Bronze medal – third place	1958 Czechoslovakia
Bronze medal – third place	1963 Romania
Goodwill Games
Gold medal – first place	1986 Moscow	Team
Silver medal – second place	1990 Seattle	Team

The Soviet Union men's national volleyball team was the national volleyball team that had represented the Soviet Union in the International competitions between 1948 until 1991.

FIVB considers Russia as the inheritor of the records of Soviet Union (1948–1991) and CIS (1992). The USSR Volleyball Federation joined the FIVB in 1948, a year after the foundation of the international governing body. The following year they triumphed in the first FIVB Men’s World Championship and have been dominating the international scene ever since, having won three Summer Olympics, six World Championships, Four World Cups and 12 European Championships.

== History ==
The USSR Volleyball Federation joined the FIVB in 1948 and the following year they won the first World Championship. The Soviets were soon regularly topping the podium at international competitions such as the Olympic Games, World Championship and European Championships and the World Cup.

== Medals ==
Event	Gold	Silver	Bronze	Total
Olympic Games	3	2	1	6
World Championship	6	2	3	11
World Cup	4	1	2	7
World League	0	0	1	1
European Championship	12	0	2	14
Summer Univesiade	3	2	1	6
Goodwill Games	1	1	0	2
Total	29	8	10	47

== Results ==
=== Olympic Games ===
Champions Runners up Third place Fourth place

Olympic Games record									Qualification					
Year	Round	Position	GP	MW	ML	SW	SL	Squad	Round	Pos	MW	ML	SW	SL
(Japan) 1964	Final	Gold	9	8	1	25	5	Squad	Qualified as the World Champions					
(Mexico) 1968	Final	Gold	9	8	1	26	8	Squad	Qualified as the defending Olympic Champions					
(Germany) 1972	Semifinals	Bronze	7	6	1	19	6	Squad	Qualified as the defending Olympic Champions					
(Canada) 1976	Final	Silver	5	4	1	14	3	Squad	Qualified as the European Champions					
(Soviet Union) 1980	Final	Gold	6	6	0	18	2	Squad	Qualified as the host country					
(United States) 1984	Boycotted								Boycotted					
(South Korea) 1988	Final	Silver	7	5	2	18	7	Squad						
Total	3 Titles	6/7	43	37	6	120	30	—						

=== World Championship ===
Champions Runners up Third place Fourth place

World Championship record
Year	Round	Position	GP	MW	ML	SW	SL	Squad
(Czechoslovakia) 1949	Final Group	Champions	8	8	0	24	2	Squad
(Soviet Union) 1952	Final Group	Champions	8	8	0	24	0	Squad
(France) 1956	Final Group	3rd Place	11	9	2	30	10	Squad
(Brazil) 1960	Final Group	Champions	10	10	0	24	5	Squad
(Soviet Union) 1962	Final Group	Champions	11	11	0	33	6	Squad
(Czechoslovakia) 1966	Final Group	3rd Place	11	7	4	29	15	Squad
(Bulgaria) 1970	Final Group	6th Place	11	6	5	22	16	Squad
(Mexico) 1974	Final Group	2nd Place	11	8	3	27	10	Squad
(Italy) 1978	Final	Champions	9	9	0	27	3	Squad
(Argentina) 1982	Final	Champions	9	9	0	27	2	Squad
(France) 1986	Final	Runners-up	8	7	1	22	5	Squad
(Brazil) 1990	Semifinals	3rd Place	7	5	2	18	6	Squad
Total	6 Titles	12/12						—

=== World Cup ===
Champions Runners up Third place Fourth place

World Cup record
Year	Round	Position	GP	MW	ML	SW	SL	Squad
(Poland) 1965		Champions	7	6	1	20	7	Squad
(East Germany) 1969		3rd Place	6	4	2	13	8	Squad
(Japan) 1977		Champions	8	7	1	23	5	Squad
(Japan) 1981	Round Robin	Champions	7	7	0	21	2	Squad
(Japan) 1985	Round Robin	Runners-up	7	5	2	18	8	Squad
(Japan) 1989	Round Robin	3rd Place	7	5	2	16	11	Squad
(Japan) 1991	Round Robin	Champions	8	7	1	22	4	Squad
Total	4 Titles	7/7						—

=== World League ===
Champions Runners up Third place Fourth place

World League record
Year	Round	Position	GP	MW	ML	SW	SL	Squad
(Japan) 1990	Semifinals	4th Place	14	8	6	29	21	Squad
(Italy) 1991	Semifinals	3rd Place	18	12	6	46	28	Squad
Total	0 Titles	2/2	32	20	12	75	49	—

=== European Championship ===
Champions Runners up Third place Fourth place

European Championship record
Year	Round	Position	GP	MW	ML	SW	SL	Squad
(Italy) 1948	did not enter							
(Bulgaria) 1950	Round Robin	Champions	5	5	0	15	0	Squad
(France) 1951	Final Group	Champions	7	7	0	21	0	Squad
(Romania) 1955	Final Group	4th Place	10	7	3	25	12	Squad
(Czechoslovakia) 1958	Final Group	3rd Place	11	8	3	29	13	Squad
(Socialist Republic of Romania) 1963	Final Group	3rd Place	9	6	3	24	16	Squad
(Turkey) 1967	Final Group	Champions	10	10	0	30	6	Squad
(Italy) 1971	Final Group	Champions	6	5	1	15	4	Squad
(Socialist Federal Republic of Yugoslavia) 1975	Final Group	Champions	7	7	0	21	3	Squad
(Finland) 1977	Final	Champions	7	6	1	19	5	Squad
(France) 1979	Final Group	Champions	7	7	0	21	3	Squad
(Bulgaria) 1981	Final Group	Champions	7	7	0	21	3	Squad
(East Germany) 1983	Final Group	Champions	7	7	0	21	3	Squad
(Netherlands) 1985	Final Group	Champions	7	7	0	21	2	Squad
(Belgium) 1987	Final	Champions	7	7	0	21	5	Squad
(Sweden) 1989	Semifinals	4th Place	7	5	2	17	10	Squad
(Germany) 1991	Final	Champions	7	7	0	21	1	Squad
Total	12 Titles	16/17						—

=== Goodwill Games ===
Champions Runners up Third place Fourth place

Goodwill Games record
Year	Round	Position	GP	MW	ML	SW	SL
(Soviet Union) 1986	Final	Champions	5	5	0	15	6
(United States) 1990	Final	Runners up	5	3	2	12	8
Total	1 Title	2/2	10	8	2	27	14

== Team ==
=== 1990 Last world Championship Squad ===
Head coach: Viacheslav Platanov

No.	Name	Date of birth	Height	Weight	1990 club
1	Oleg Shatunov	1 February 1967 (aged 23)	200 cm (6 ft 7 in)	100 kg (220 lb)	Automobilist
2	Andrey Kuznetsov	14 April 1968 (aged 22)	199 cm (6 ft 6 in)	95 kg (209 lb)	CSKA Moskva
3	Oleksandr Shadchyn	17 April 1969 (aged 21)	204 cm (6 ft 8 in)	91 kg (201 lb)	Shakhter
4	Ruslan Olikhver	24 April 1969 (aged 21)	201 cm (6 ft 7 in)	98 kg (216 lb)	Radiotekhnik
5	Igor Runov	8 February 1963 (aged 27)	202 cm (6 ft 8 in)	98 kg (216 lb)	CSKA Moskva
6	Evgueni Krasilnikov	7 April 1965 (aged 25)	191 cm (6 ft 3 in)	89 kg (196 lb)	Dinamo
8	Dimitri Fomin	21 January 1968 (aged 22)	200 cm (6 ft 7 in)	94 kg (207 lb)	CSKA Moskva
9	Igor Naumov	28 April 1967 (aged 23)	200 cm (6 ft 7 in)	94 kg (207 lb)	Iskra
10	Yuri Sapega	1 January 1965 (aged 25)	196 cm (6 ft 5 in)	96 kg (212 lb)	
11	Yaroslav Antonov	10 January 1963 (aged 27)	198 cm (6 ft 6 in)	95 kg (209 lb)	CSKA Moskva
12	Yuriy Cherednik	25 July 1966 (aged 24)	203 cm (6 ft 8 in)	95 kg (209 lb)	Automobilist
13	Viktor Sidelnikov	15 January 1963 (aged 27)	191 cm (6 ft 3 in)	84 kg (185 lb)	Automobilist

== New national teams ==
After the dissolution of the Soviet Union, Russia succeeded the Soviet Union while its other former republics started competing as their own national teams:

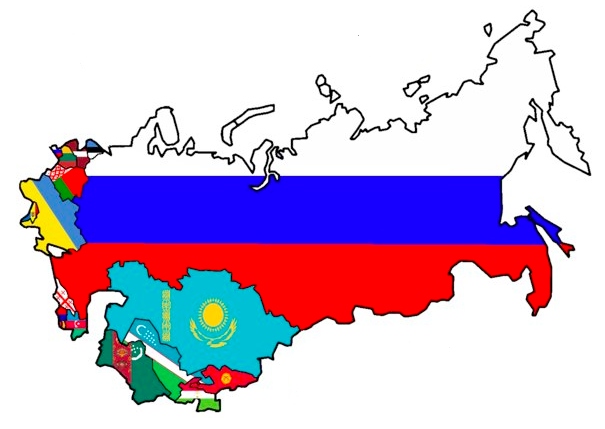

Here is a list of men's national teams on the Soviet Union area:

- Armenia
- Azerbaijan
- Belarus
- Estonia
- Georgia
- Kazakhstan
- Kyrgyzstan
- Latvia
- Lithuania
- Moldova
- Tajikistan
- Turkmenistan
- Ukraine
- Uzbekistan
