= Czechoslovakia men's national volleyball team =

National volleyball team

Czechoslovakia
- Association: Czechoslovakia Volleyball Federation (CVF)
- Confederation: CEV
- FIVB ranking: NR (1 October 2026)

Uniforms
Home	Away	Third

Summer Olympics
- Appearances: 5 (First in 1964)
- Best result: (silver) Runners-Up : (1964)

World Championship
- Appearances: 12 (First in 1949)
- Best result: (gold) Champions : (1956, 1966)

World Cup
- Appearances: 3 (First in 1965)
- Best result: Third place : (1965, 1985)

European Championship
- Appearances: 16 (First in 1948)
- Best result: (gold) Champions : (1948, 1955, 1958)
- www.cvf.cz (in Czech)
Honours
Olympic Games
Silver medal – second place	1964 Tokyo	Team
Bronze medal – third place	1968 Mexico City	Team
World Championship
Gold medal – first place	1956 France
Gold medal – first place	1966 Czechoslovakia
Silver medal – second place	1949 Czechoslovakia
Silver medal – second place	1952 Soviet Union
Silver medal – second place	1960 Brazil
Silver medal – second place	1962 Soviet Union
World Cup
Bronze medal – third place	1965 Poland
Bronze medal – third place	1985 Japan
European Championship
Gold medal – first place	1948 Italy
Gold medal – first place	1955 Romania
Gold medal – first place	1958 Czechoslovakia
Silver medal – second place	1950 Bulgaria
Silver medal – second place	1967 Turkey
Silver medal – second place	1971 Italy
Silver medal – second place	1985 Netherlands

The Czechoslovakia national men's volleyball team was the national volleyball team for Czechoslovakia that had represented the country in international competitions and friendly matches between 1948–1993

FIVB considers Czech Republic (national team) as the inheritor of the records of Czechoslovakia (1948–1993). The Czech team’s first participations in international competitions saw them win a gold medal at the inaugural European Championship in 1948 which kick-started a golden age for the team. They won two more European in 1955 and 1958, two golds at the World Championships of 1956 and 1966, and a further eight medals in other elite tournaments. They took silver at the Tokyo 1964 Olympic Games and followed that with the bronze four years later in Mexico City.

== Results ==
=== Olympic Games ===
- (Japan) 1964 — Silver medal
- (Mexico) 1968 — Bronze medal
- (West Germany) 1972 — 6th place
- (Canada) 1976 — 5th place
- (Soviet Union) 1980 — 8th place

=== World Championship ===
- 1949 Czechoslovakia – Silver medal
- 1952 Soviet Union – Silver medal
- 1956 France – Gold medal
- 1960 Brazil – Silver medal
- 1962 Soviet Union – Silver medal
- 1966 Czechoslovakia – Gold medal
- 1970 Bulgaria – 4th place
- 1974 Mexico – 5th place
- 1978 Italy – 5th place
- 1982 Argentina – 9th place
- 1986 France – 8th place
- 1990 Brazil – 9th place

=== World Cup ===
- 1965 Poland — Bronze medal
- 1969 East Germany — 5th place
- 1985 Japan — Bronze medal

=== European Championship ===
- 1948 Italy — Gold medal
- 1950 Bulgaria — Silver medal
- 1955 Romania — Gold medal
- 1958 Czechoslovakia — Gold medal
- 1963 Romania — 5th place
- 1967 Turkey — Silver medal
- 1971 Italy — Silver medal
- (Socialist Federal Republic of Yugoslavia) 1975 Yugoslavia — 6th place
- 1977 Finland — 6th place
- 1979 France — 6th place
- 1981 Bulgaria — 4th place
- 1983 East Germany — 5th place
- 1985 Netherlands — Silver medal
- 1987 Belgium — 6th place
- 1991 Germany — 12th place
- 1993 Finland — 8th place

== 1990 Last World Championship squad ==
Head coach: Rudolf Matejka, Zdenek Pommer

No.	Name	Date of birth	Height	Weight	1990 club
1	Josef Smolka	30 May 1964 (aged 26)	193 cm (6 ft 4 in)	84 kg (185 lb)	Dukla Liberec
2	Milan Džavoronok	1 November 1961 (aged 28)	191 cm (6 ft 3 in)	86 kg (190 lb)	Aero Odolena Voda
3	Zdeněk Kaláb	9 February 1961 (aged 29)	203 cm (6 ft 8 in)	103 kg (227 lb)	(Italy) Città di Castello
4	Bronislav Mikyska	14 August 1963 (aged 27)	205 cm (6 ft 9 in)	101 kg (223 lb)	Zbrojovka Brno
5	Peter Goga	6 October 1965 (aged 25)	189 cm (6 ft 2 in)	75 kg (165 lb)	PSK Praga
7	Martin Skalicka	23 April 1965 (aged 25)	205 cm (6 ft 9 in)	88 kg (194 lb)	Tjzlin
8	Roman Macek	26 September 1962 (aged 28)	186 cm (6 ft 1 in)	84 kg (185 lb)	Tjzlin
9	Štefan Chrtianský	13 May 1962 (aged 28)	200 cm (6 ft 7 in)	93 kg (205 lb)	PSK Bratislava
10	Pavel Barborka	22 September 1961 (aged 29)	198 cm (6 ft 6 in)	85 kg (187 lb)	PSK Praga
11	Igor Stejskal	14 October 1968 (aged 22)	197 cm (6 ft 6 in)	88 kg (194 lb)	Zbrojovka Brno
12	Petr Galis	13 May 1965 (aged 25)	194 cm (6 ft 4 in)	100 kg (220 lb)	PSK Praga
13	Michal Palinek	10 August 1967 (aged 23)	189 cm (6 ft 2 in)	80 kg (180 lb)	Zbrojovka Brno

== See also ==
- Czechoslovakia women's national volleyball team
