= 1956 FIVB Men's Volleyball World Championship =

1956 FIVB World Championship
Tournament details
- Host country: France
- Dates: 30 August – 12 September
- Teams: 24
- Venue: 1 (in 1 host city)
- Officially opened by: René Coty

Final positions
- Champions: Czechoslovakia (1st title)

The 1956 FIVB Men's World Championship was the third edition of the tournament, organised by the world's governing body, the FIVB. It was held from 30 August to 12 September 1956 in Paris, France.

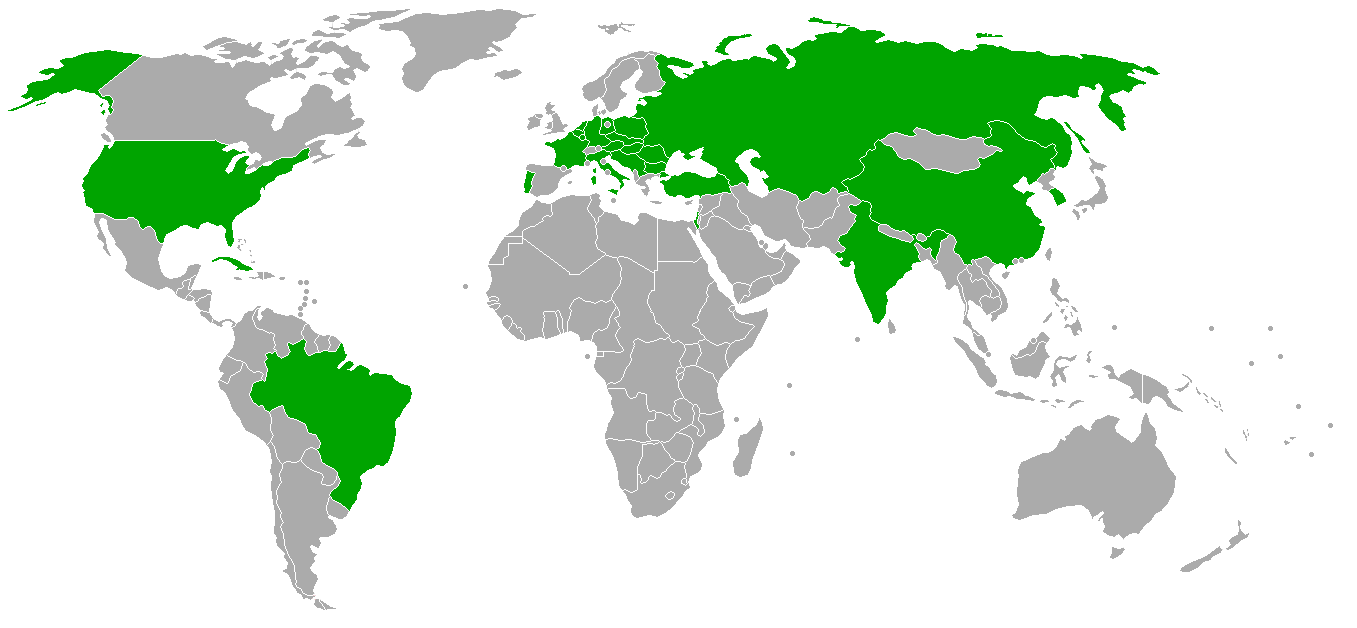
Map showing nations that participated in the tournament

== Teams ==
No qualifications, free entrance.

Pool A

- South Korea
- Soviet Union
- Turkey

Pool B

- Czechoslovakia
- East Germany

Pool C

- Austria
- Bulgaria

Pool D

- Italy
- Romania

Pool E

- Hungary
- Netherlands

Pool F

- France (Host)
- Israel
- Luxembourg

Pool G

- Belgium
- United States

Pool H

- Brazil
- China
- India

Pool I

- Portugal
- West Germany
- Yugoslavia

Pool J

- Cuba
- Poland

== Results ==
=== First round ===
==== Pool A ====
Pos	Team	Pld	W	L	Pts	SW	SL	SR	SPW	SPL	SPR	Qualification
1	Soviet Union	2	2	0	4	6	0	MAX	90	23	3.913	Final places
2	South Korea	2	1	1	3	3	5	0.600	75	95	0.789	11th–20th places
3	Turkey	2	0	2	2	2	6	0.333	59	106	0.557	21st–24th places

Date		Score		Set 1	Set 2	Set 3	Set 4	Set 5	Total
30 Aug	South Korea	3–2	Turkey	4–15	15–5	12–15	15–5	15–10	61–50
31 Aug	Soviet Union	3–0	Turkey	15–0	15–5	15–4			45–9
1 Sep	Soviet Union	3–0	South Korea	15–2	15–8	15–4			45–14

==== Pool B ====
Pos	Team	Pld	W	L	Pts	SW	SL	SR	SPW	SPL	SPR	Q21
1	Czechoslovakia	1	1	0	2	3	0	MAX	45	16	2.813	Final places
2	East Germany	1	0	1	1	0	3	0.000	16	45	0.356	11th–20th places

Date		Score		Set 1	Set 2	Set 3	Set 4	Set 5	Total
31 Aug	Czechoslovakia	3–0	East Germany	15–5	15–4	15–7			45–16

==== Pool C ====
Pos	Team	Pld	W	L	Pts	SW	SL	SR	SPW	SPL	SPR	Qualification
1	Bulgaria	1	1	0	2	3	0	MAX	45	7	6.429	Final places
2	Austria	1	0	1	1	0	3	0.000	7	45	0.156	11th–20th places

Date		Score		Set 1	Set 2	Set 3	Set 4	Set 5	Total
31 Aug	Bulgaria	3–0	Austria	15–1	15–3	15–3			45–7

==== Pool D ====
Pos	Team	Pld	W	L	Pts	SW	SL	SR	SPW	SPL	SPR	Qualification
1	Romania	1	1	0	2	3	0	MAX	45	23	1.957	Final places
2	Italy	1	0	1	1	0	3	0.000	23	45	0.511	11th–20th places

Date		Score		Set 1	Set 2	Set 3	Set 4	Set 5	Total
31 Aug	Romania	3–0	Italy	15–10	15–10	15–3			45–23

==== Pool E ====
Pos	Team	Pld	W	L	Pts	SW	SL	SR	SPW	SPL	SPR	Qualification
1	Hungary	1	1	0	2	3	0	MAX	45	23	1.957	Final places
2	Netherlands	1	0	1	1	0	3	0.000	23	45	0.511	11th–20th places

Date		Score		Set 1	Set 2	Set 3	Set 4	Set 5	Total
31 Aug	Hungary	3–0	Netherlands	15–8	15–8	15–7			45–23

==== Pool F ====
Pos	Team	Pld	W	L	Pts	SW	SL	SR	SPW	SPL	SPR	Qualification
1	France	2	2	0	4	6	0	MAX	90	20	4.500	Final places
2	Israel	2	1	1	3	3	3	1.000	61	58	1.052	11th–20th places
3	Luxembourg	2	0	2	2	0	6	0.000	17	90	0.189	21st–24th places

Date		Score		Set 1	Set 2	Set 3	Set 4	Set 5	Total
30 Aug	France	3–0	Israel	15–4	15–6	15–6			45–16
31 Aug	Israel	3–0	Luxembourg	15–8	15–2	15–3			45–13
1 Sep	France	3–0	Luxembourg	15–1	15–1	15–2			45–4

==== Pool G ====
Pos	Team	Pld	W	L	Pts	SW	SL	SR	SPW	SPL	SPR	Qualification
1	United States	1	1	0	2	3	0	MAX	45	26	1.731	Final places
2	Belgium	1	0	1	1	0	3	0.000	26	45	0.578	11th–20th places

Date		Score		Set 1	Set 2	Set 3	Set 4	Set 5	Total
31 Aug	United States	3–0	Belgium	15–2	15–12	15–12			45–26

==== Pool H ====
Pos	Team	Pld	W	L	Pts	SW	SL	SR	SPW	SPL	SPR	Qualification
1	China	2	2	0	4	6	2	3.000	106	81	1.309	Final places
2	Brazil	2	1	1	3	4	5	0.800	107	99	1.081	11th–20th places
3	India	2	0	2	2	3	6	0.500	84	117	0.718	21st–24th places

Date		Score		Set 1	Set 2	Set 3	Set 4	Set 5	Total
30 Aug	Brazil	3–2	India	6–15	15–6	15–8	11–15	15–4	62–48
31 Aug	China	3–1	Brazil	15–10	15–9	6–15	15–11		51–45
1 Sep	China	3–1	India	15–5	15–9	10–15	15–7		55–36

==== Pool I ====
Pos	Team	Pld	W	L	Pts	SW	SL	SR	SPW	SPL	SPR	Qualification
1	Yugoslavia	2	2	0	4	6	0	MAX	91	26	3.500	Final places
2	Portugal	2	1	1	3	3	3	1.000	69	51	1.353	11th–20th places
3	West Germany	2	0	2	2	0	6	0.000	7	90	0.078	21st–24th places

Date		Score		Set 1	Set 2	Set 3	Set 4	Set 5	Total
30 Aug	Portugal	3–0	West Germany	15–2	15–1	15–2			45–5
31 Aug	Yugoslavia	3–0	West Germany	15–0	15–2	15–0			45–2
1 Sep	Yugoslavia	3–0	Portugal	15–4	15–6	16–14			46–24

==== Pool J ====
Pos	Team	Pld	W	L	Pts	SW	SL	SR	SPW	SPL	SPR	Qualification
1	Poland	1	1	0	2	3	0	MAX	45	4	11.250	Final places
2	Cuba	1	0	1	1	0	3	0.000	4	45	0.089	11th–20th places

Date		Score		Set 1	Set 2	Set 3	Set 4	Set 5	Total
31 Aug	Poland	3–0	Cuba	15–2	15–1	15–1			45–4

=== Final round ===
==== 21st–24th places ====
Pos	Team	Pld	W	L	Pts	SW	SL	SR	SPW	SPL	SPR
21	India	3	3	0	6	9	0	MAX	135	30	4.500
22	Turkey	3	2	1	5	6	3	2.000	108	66	1.636
23	Luxembourg	3	1	2	4	3	6	0.500	62	111	0.559
24	West Germany	3	0	3	3	0	9	0.000	37	135	0.274

Date		Score		Set 1	Set 2	Set 3	Set 4	Set 5	Total
2 Sep	India	3–0	West Germany	15–0	15–2	15–5			45–7
2 Sep	Turkey	3–0	Luxembourg	15–1	15–5	15–6			45–12
3 Sep	Turkey	3–0	West Germany	15–2	15–5	15–2			45–9
3 Sep	India	3–0	Luxembourg	15–1	15–2	15–2			45–5
5 Sep	Luxembourg	3–0	West Germany	15–3	15–11	15–7			45–21
5 Sep	India	3–0	Turkey	15–6	15–6	15–6			45–18

==== 11th–20th places ====
Pos	Team	Pld	W	L	Pts	SW	SL	SR	SPW	SPL	SPR
11	Brazil	9	9	0	18	27	1	27.000	418	238	1.756
12	East Germany	9	8	1	17	24	9	2.667	464	342	1.357
13	Netherlands	9	7	2	16	21	9	2.333	422	338	1.249
14	Italy	9	6	3	15	22	11	2.000	420	342	1.228
15	Portugal	9	5	4	14	16	15	1.067	391	380	1.029
16	Israel	9	4	5	13	15	18	0.833	405	413	0.981
17	Belgium	9	2	7	11	10	23	0.435	363	456	0.796
18	South Korea	9	2	7	11	13	23	0.565	373	452	0.825
19	Cuba	9	2	7	11	10	23	0.435	363	439	0.827
20	Austria	9	0	9	9	1	27	0.037	196	415	0.472

Date		Score		Set 1	Set 2	Set 3	Set 4	Set 5	Total
2 Sep	Italy	3–0	South Korea	15–0	15–2	15–5			45–7
2 Sep	Brazil	3–0	Israel	15–8	15–13	15–8			45–29
2 Sep	Portugal	3–0	Austria	15–2	15–7	15–10			45–19
2 Sep	Belgium	3–1	Cuba	8–15	15–9	15–13	15–1		53–38
2 Sep	East Germany	3–0	Netherlands	15–7	15–12	15–12			45–31

Date		Score		Set 1	Set 2	Set 3	Set 4	Set 5	Total
3 Sep	Portugal	3–0	Israel	15–10	16–14	15–8			46–32
3 Sep	Brazil	3–0	Cuba	15–5	15–8	17–15			47–28
3 Sep	Netherlands	3–2	South Korea	15–11	6–15	10–15	15–9	15–6	61–56
3 Sep	East Germany	3–2	Belgium	15–11	14–16	11–15	15–8	15–2	70–52
3 Sep	Italy	3–0	Austria	15–3	15–7	15–6			45–16

Date		Score		Set 1	Set 2	Set 3	Set 4	Set 5	Total
5 Sep	East Germany	3–0	South Korea	15–11	15–5	16–14			46–30
5 Sep	Brazil	3–0	Belgium	15–3	15–6	15–8			45–17
5 Sep	Netherlands	3–0	Austria	15–3	15–4	15–9			45–16
5 Sep	Portugal	3–2	Cuba	12–15	15–7	7–15	15–8	15–11	64–56
5 Sep	Italy	3–1	Israel	15–9	5–15	16–14	15–8		51–46

Date		Score		Set 1	Set 2	Set 3	Set 4	Set 5	Total
6 Sep	Italy	3–0	Cuba	15–10	17–15	15–11			47–36
6 Sep	South Korea	3–0	Austria	15–11	15–13	15–3			45–27
6 Sep	Portugal	3–1	Belgium	15–8	15–6	7–15	15–12		52–41
6 Sep	Brazil	3–0	East Germany	15–10	15–9	15–11			45–30
6 Sep	Netherlands	3–1	Israel	15–7	15–9	7–15	15–7		52–38

Date		Score		Set 1	Set 2	Set 3	Set 4	Set 5	Total
8 Sep	Italy	3–0	Belgium	15–3	18–16	15–3			48–22
8 Sep	Israel	3–2	South Korea	15–10	12–15	11–15	15–12	15–7	68–59
8 Sep	East Germany	3–0	Austria	15–5	15–11	15–7			45–23
8 Sep	Netherlands	3–1	Cuba	8–15	15–10	15–5	15–8		53–38
8 Sep	Brazil	3–0	Portugal	16–14	15–4	15–13			46–31

Date		Score		Set 1	Set 2	Set 3	Set 4	Set 5	Total
9 Sep	East Germany	3–1	Portugal	15–5	16–14	12–15	15–12		58–46
9 Sep	Israel	3–0	Austria	15–6	15–3	15–8			45–17
9 Sep	Cuba	3–2	South Korea	15–5	15–7	13–15	8–15	15–7	66–49
9 Sep	Brazil	3–1	Italy	15–7	10–15	15–13	15–5		55–40
9 Sep	Netherlands	3–0	Belgium	15–11	15–8	15–10			45–29

Date		Score		Set 1	Set 2	Set 3	Set 4	Set 5	Total
10 Sep	South Korea	3–2	Belgium	13–15	10–15	15–3	15–8	15–4	68–45
10 Sep	East Germany	3–1	Israel	11–15	15–6	16–14	15–8		57–43
10 Sep	Brazil	3–0	Netherlands	15–10	15–8	15–13			45–31
10 Sep	Cuba	3–0	Austria	15–13	15–13	15–10			45–36
10 Sep	Italy	3–0	Portugal	15–9	15–12	15–12			45–33

Date		Score		Set 1	Set 2	Set 3	Set 4	Set 5	Total
11 Sep	Netherlands	3–0	Portugal	15–11	15–7	15–7			45–25
11 Sep	Belgium	3–1	Austria	15–12	10–15	15–0	15–4		55–31
11 Sep	Israel	3–0	Cuba	15–12	15–13	15–12			45–37
11 Sep	East Germany	3–2	Italy	14–16	15–4	9–15	15–9	15–9	68–53
11 Sep	Brazil	3–0	South Korea	15–8	15–4	15–9			45–21

Date		Score		Set 1	Set 2	Set 3	Set 4	Set 5	Total
12 Sep	Netherlands	3–1	Italy	14–16	15–12	15–7	15–11		59–46
12 Sep	Portugal	3–1	South Korea	11–15	15–8	17–15	17–15		49–38
12 Sep	East Germany	3–0	Cuba	15–8	15–1	15–10			45–19
12 Sep	Brazil	3–0	Austria	15–3	15–6	15–2			45–11
12 Sep	Israel	3–1	Belgium	15–11	10–15	19–17	15–6		59–49

==== Final places ====
Pos	Team	Pld	W	L	Pts	SW	SL	SR	SPW	SPL	SPR
1	Czechoslovakia	9	9	0	18	27	7	3.857	474	314	1.510
2	Romania	9	7	2	16	24	13	1.846	485	422	1.149
3	Soviet Union	9	7	2	16	24	10	2.400	471	352	1.338
4	Poland	9	6	3	15	20	11	1.818	412	375	1.099
5	Bulgaria	9	5	4	14	21	16	1.313	493	433	1.139
6	United States	9	4	5	13	15	18	0.833	395	434	0.910
7	France	9	3	6	12	13	21	0.619	357	457	0.781
8	Hungary	9	2	7	11	10	24	0.417	351	474	0.741
9	China	9	1	8	10	6	25	0.240	333	440	0.757
10	Yugoslavia	9	1	8	10	11	26	0.423	429	499	0.860

Date		Score		Set 1	Set 2	Set 3	Set 4	Set 5	Total
2 Sep	Poland	3–1	Romania	13–15	15–9	15–11	15–7		58–42
2 Sep	Czechoslovakia	3–1	Yugoslavia	15–9	15–13	7–15	15–6		52–43
2 Sep	France	3–1	China	15–11	15–11	6–15	16–14		52–51
2 Sep	United States	3–1	Hungary	15–4	13–15	15–7	16–14		59–40
2 Sep	Soviet Union	3–2	Bulgaria	15–13	15–9	9–15	8–15	15–9	62–61

Date		Score		Set 1	Set 2	Set 3	Set 4	Set 5	Total
3 Sep	Czechoslovakia	3–2	Romania	3–15	11–15	15–9	15–2	15–3	59–44
3 Sep	Soviet Union	3–0	United States	15–10	15–2	15–8			45–20
3 Sep	Bulgaria	3–2	Yugoslavia	15–7	13–15	13–15	15–6	15–7	71–50
3 Sep	Hungary	3–2	France	17–15	16–14	5–15	12–15	15–12	65–71
3 Sep	Poland	3–0	China	15–8	19–17	15–9			49–34

Date		Score		Set 1	Set 2	Set 3	Set 4	Set 5	Total
5 Sep	Czechoslovakia	3–0	China	15–13	15–3	15–8			45–24
5 Sep	Poland	3–0	France	15–5	15–11	15–6			45–22
5 Sep	Soviet Union	3–0	Hungary	15–11	15–9	15–2			45–22
5 Sep	Romania	3–1	Bulgaria	15–13	15–7	5–15	15–12		50–47
5 Sep	United States	3–0	Yugoslavia	15–8	15–12	15–12			45–32

Date		Score		Set 1	Set 2	Set 3	Set 4	Set 5	Total
6 Sep	Poland	3–0	Hungary	15–11	15–12	15–10			45–33
6 Sep	Romania	3–2	United States	15–12	10–15	13–15	15–8	21–19	74–69
6 Sep	Czechoslovakia	3–0	France	15–2	15–3	15–5			45–10
6 Sep	Soviet Union	3–0	Yugoslavia	15–12	17–15	15–10			47–37
6 Sep	Bulgaria	3–0	China	15–10	15–10	15–9			45–29

Date		Score		Set 1	Set 2	Set 3	Set 4	Set 5	Total
8 Sep	Bulgaria	3–1	France	8–15	15–12	15–13	15–10		53–50
8 Sep	Czechoslovakia	3–0	Poland	15–8	15–8	15–9			45–25
8 Sep	Romania	3–1	Soviet Union	15–9	15–17	15–12	15–11		60–49
8 Sep	United States	3–1	China	15–13	15–13	12–15	15–12		57–53
8 Sep	Yugoslavia	3–2	Hungary	15–10	10–15	15–7	2–15	15–9	57–56

Date		Score		Set 1	Set 2	Set 3	Set 4	Set 5	Total
9 Sep	Bulgaria	3–1	Poland	14–16	15–10	15–6	15–6		59–38
9 Sep	Soviet Union	3–0	China	15–4	15–8	15–4			45–16
9 Sep	France	3–1	United States	11–15	15–7	15–9	15–12		56–43
9 Sep	Czechoslovakia	3–0	Hungary	15–5	15–9	15–6			45–20
9 Sep	Romania	3–2	Yugoslavia	15–6	10–15	12–15	15–12	15–12	67–60

Date		Score		Set 1	Set 2	Set 3	Set 4	Set 5	Total
10 Sep	China	3–1	Yugoslavia	15–9	16–14	6–15	15–9		52–47
10 Sep	Czechoslovakia	3–2	Bulgaria	15–11	11–15	17–19	15–8	17–15	75–68
10 Sep	Soviet Union	3–1	France	15–5	13–15	15–0	15–4		58–24
10 Sep	Poland	3–0	United States	15–8	15–6	15–13			45–27
10 Sep	Romania	3–1	Hungary	15–3	13–15	15–7	15–9		58–34

Date		Score		Set 1	Set 2	Set 3	Set 4	Set 5	Total
11 Sep	France	3–1	Yugoslavia	15–9	4–15	15–13	17–15		51–52
11 Sep	Bulgaria	3–0	Hungary	15–5	15–9	15–12			45–26
11 Sep	Czechoslovakia	3–0	United States	15–4	15–8	15–10			45–22
11 Sep	Romania	3–0	China	15–4	15–10	15–11			45–25
11 Sep	Soviet Union	3–1	Poland	18–16	15–11	14–16	15–6		62–49

Date		Score		Set 1	Set 2	Set 3	Set 4	Set 5	Total
12 Sep	Hungary	3–1	China	15–9	15–10	8–15	17–15		55–49
12 Sep	United States	3–1	Bulgaria	8–15	15–12	15–6	15–11		53–44
12 Sep	Poland	3–1	Yugoslavia	15–13	15–12	13–15	15–11		58–51
12 Sep	Romania	3–0	France	15–7	15–8	15–6			45–21
12 Sep	Czechoslovakia	3–2	Soviet Union	9–15	15–3	15–13	9–15	15–12	63–58

== Final standing ==
Rank	Team
1st place, gold medalist(s)	Czechoslovakia
2nd place, silver medalist(s)	Romania
3rd place, bronze medalist(s)	Soviet Union
4	Poland
5	Bulgaria
6	United States
7	France
8	Hungary
9	China
10	Yugoslavia
11	Brazil
12	East Germany
13	Netherlands
14	Italy
15	Portugal
16	Israel
17	Belgium
18	South Korea
19	Cuba
20	Austria
21	India
22	Turkey
23	Luxembourg
24	West Germany

1956 Men's World champions

Czechoslovakia
1st title
