= 1951 Men's European Volleyball Championship =

1951 Championnat d'Europe de volley-ball (French)

Tournament details
- Host country: France
- City: (France) Paris
- Dates: 12–22 September
- Teams: 10 (from 1 confederation)
- Venue: 2 (in 1 host city)

Final positions
- Champions: Soviet Union (2nd title)
- Runners-up: Bulgaria
- Third place: France
- Fourth place: Romania

Tournament statistics
- Matches played: 33

The 1951 Men's European Volleyball Championship was the 3rd edition of the Men's European Volleyball Championship. The 3rd edition of this Championship was oganized by the European Volleyball governing body under the FIVB after they got established in 1947.

The tournament took place from the 12th to the 22nd of September 1951 in Paris, France. Ten countries participated in the tournament. The Soviet Union returned to defend their 1950 crown and we had 2 countries that made their debut to the Men's European Volleyball Championship

The 1951 Men's European Volleyball Championship was the first time this tournament was played as a round robin tournament with preliminary rounds and than a final round with the top 2 teams of each preliminary rounds. The final standing after the final round determined the European champion. A total of 33 matches were played between the preliminary rounds and the final round.

Soviet Union became the European Champions for the 2nd time after successfully defending their crown with a commanding dominance over the other teams. They finished the tournament with a perfect 7-0 record and a 21-0 set record, after dominating Pool A by losing only 17 points in two matches.

== Teams ==
In the 1951 Men's European Volleyball Championship there were 10 countries who participated in the tournament.

Soviet Union returned to the tournament as defending champions. We had 2 countries as debutants to the Men's European Volleyball Championship and the other 7 countries are returning countries.

=== Summary of qualified teams ===
Team	Information	Appearance(s)			Previous best performance (Note: Bold text indicates they hosted that edition.)
Team	Information	Total	First	Last	Previous best performance
France	Host	2nd	1948		2nd (1948)
Soviet Union	Defending Champions	2nd	1950		Champions (1950)
Belgium	Returning country	2nd	1948		5th (1948)
Bulgaria	Returning country	2nd	1950		4th (1950)
Israel	Debut				
Italy	Returning country	2nd	1948		4th (1948)
Netherlands	Returning country	2nd	1948		6th (1948)
Portugal	Returning country	2nd	1948		4th (1948)
Romania	Returning country	2nd	1950		5th (1950)
Yugoslavia	Debut				

== Overview of venue ==
Tournament venue information

Venue	Games
(France) Stade Pierre-de-Coubertin	8
(France) Palais des Sports de Grenelle	25

(France) Paris
Stade Pierre-de-Coubertin	Palais des Sports de Grenelle
Capacity: 5,000	Capacity: 17,000
1951 Men's European Volleyball Championship is located in Europe

== Preliminary round ==
- The top two teams in each pool will qualify for the final round.
- Match won: 2 match point awarded to the winner
- Match loss: 1 match point awarded to the loser

=== Pool A ===
Pos	Team	Pld	W	L	Pts	SW	SL	SR	SPW	SPL	SPR	Qualification
1	Soviet Union	2	2	0	4	6	0	MAX	90	17	5.294	Final round
2	Belgium	2	1	1	3	3	3	1.000	49	76	0.645	Final round
3	Italy	2	0	2	2	0	6	0.000	44	90	0.489	

Source: CEV 1951

Date	Time		Score		Set 1	Set 2	Set 3	Set 4	Set 5	Total	Report
15 Sep		Belgium	3–0	Italy	15–6	15–12	15–13			45–31	Report
16 Sep		Soviet Union	3–0	Italy	15–4	15–7	15–2			45–13	Report
17 Sep		Soviet Union	3–0	Belgium	15–2	15–1	15–1			45–4	Report

=== Pool B ===
Pos	Team	Pld	W	L	Pts	SW	SL	SR	SPW	SPL	SPR	Qualification
1	Bulgaria	3	3	0	6	9	1	9.000	149	69	2.159	Final round
2	Yugoslavia	3	2	1	5	7	3	2.333	138	115	1.200	Final round
3	Portugal	3	1	2	4	3	7	0.429	106	138	0.768	
4	Netherlands	3	0	3	3	1	9	0.111	76	147	0.517	

Source: CEV 1951

Date	Time		Score		Set 1	Set 2	Set 3	Set 4	Set 5	Total	Report
15 Sep		Yugoslavia	3–0	Portugal	15–12	15–7	16–14			46–33	Report
16 Sep		Bulgaria	3–1	Yugoslavia	15–10	15–8	14–16	15–13		59–47	Report
16 Sep		Portugal	3–1	Netherlands	11–15	15–12	16–14	15–6		57–47	Report
17 Sep		Yugoslavia	3–0	Netherlands	15–3	15–8	15–12			45–23	Report
17 Sep		Bulgaria	3–0	Portugal	15–5	15–10	15–1			45–16	Report
18 Sep		Bulgaria	3–0	Netherlands	15–1	15–3	15–2			45–6	Report

=== Pool C ===
Pos	Team	Pld	W	L	Pts	SW	SL	SR	SPW	SPL	SPR	Qualification
1	Romania	2	2	0	4	6	1	6.000	104	64	1.625	Final round
2	France	2	1	1	3	4	3	1.333	95	82	1.159	Final round
3	Israel	2	0	2	2	0	6	0.000	37	90	0.411	

Source: CEV 1951

Date	Time		Score		Set 1	Set 2	Set 3	Set 4	Set 5	Total	Report
15 Sep		France	3–0	Israel	15–10	15–7	15–6			45–23	Report
16 Sep		Romania	3–1	France	13–15	15–9	16–14	15–12		59–50	Report
17 Sep		Romania	3–0	Israel	15–3	15–5	15–6			45–14	Report

== Final round ==
=== Placement group 1st - 6th ===
Pos	Team	Pld	W	L	Pts	SW	SL	SR	SPW	SPL	SPR
1	Soviet Union	5	5	0	10	15	0	MAX	225	90	2.500
2	Bulgaria	5	3	2	8	11	8	1.375	234	187	1.251
3	France	5	3	2	8	9	10	0.900	225	238	0.945
4	Romania	5	2	3	7	10	9	1.111	229	231	0.991
5	Yugoslavia	5	2	3	7	8	11	0.727	211	249	0.847
6	Belgium	5	0	5	5	0	15	0.000	97	226	0.429

Source: CEV 1951

Date	Time		Score		Set 1	Set 2	Set 3	Set 4	Set 5	Total	Report
18 Sep		Soviet Union	3–0	Yugoslavia	15–12	15–2	15–11			45–25	
18 Sep		France	3–2	Bulgaria	15–12	15–9	5–15	10–15	15–12	60–63	
18 Sep		Romania	3–0	Belgium	15–8	15–3	15–5			45–16	
19 Sep		Yugoslavia	3–2	Romania	11–15	15–9	5–15	15–10	17–15	63–64	
19 Sep		Soviet Union	3–0	France	15–2	15–6	15–7			45–15	
19 Sep		Bulgaria	3–0	Belgium	15–2	15–8	15–7			45–17	
20 Sep		Bulgaria	3–0	Yugoslavia	15–5	15–6	15–8			45–19	
20 Sep		Soviet Union	3–0	Romania	15–9	15–9	15–7			45–25	
20 Sep		France	3–0	Belgium	15–8	15–10	15–5			45–23	
21 Sep		France	3–2	Yugoslavia	7–15	15–6	15–12	12–15	15–10	64–58	
21 Sep		Soviet Union	3–0	Belgium	15–4	15–3	15–3			45–10	
21 Sep		Bulgaria	3–2	Romania	15–1	15–8	8–15	13–15	15–7	66–46	
22 Sep		Yugoslavia	3–0	Belgium	16–14	15–11	15–6			46–31	
22 Sep		Soviet Union	3–0	Bulgaria	15–8	15–3	15–4			45–15	
22 Sep		Romania	3–0	France	17–15	15–11	17–15			49–41	

=== Placement group 7th - 10th ===
Pos	Team	Pld	W	L	Pts	SW	SL	SR	SPW	SPL	SPR
7	Portugal	3	3	0	6	9	2	4.500	151	121	1.248
8	Italy	3	2	1	5	8	3	2.667	159	128	1.242
9	Netherlands	3	1	2	4	3	8	0.375	130	149	0.872
10	Israel	3	0	3	3	2	9	0.222	118	160	0.738

Source: CEV 1951

Date	Time		Score		Set 1	Set 2	Set 3	Set 4	Set 5	Total	Report
19 Sep		Portugal	3–2	Italy	9–15	15–12	7–15	15–13	15–11	61–66	
19 Sep		Netherlands	3–2	Israel	13–15	18–16	15–8	6–15	15–5	67–59	
20 Sep		Italy	3–0	Israel	15–9	15–6	18–16			48–31	
20 Sep		Portugal	3–0	Netherlands	15–9	15–7	15–11			45–27	
21 Sep		Italy	3–0	Netherlands	15–10	15–13	15–13			45–36	
21 Sep		Portugal	3–0	Israel	15–9	15–6	15–13			45–28	

== Final ranking ==
Place	Team
1st place, gold medalist(s)	Soviet Union
2nd place, silver medalist(s)	Bulgaria
3rd place, bronze medalist(s)	France
4.	Romania
5.	Yugoslavia
6.	Belgium
7.	Portugal
8.	Italy
9.	Netherlands
10.	Israel

1951 Men's European champions

Soviet Union
Second title

== Sources ==
- CEV
- Results
- Results (Archived 2009-07-21)
- CEV 1951 (2026-09-27)
