= 1962 FIVB Men's Volleyball World Championship =

1962 FIVB World Championship
Tournament details
- Host country: Soviet Union
- Dates: 12–26 October
- Teams: 21
- Venues: 4 (in 4 host cities)
- Officially opened by: Nikita Khrushchev

Final positions
- Champions: Soviet Union (4th title)

The 1962 FIVB Men's World Championship was the fifth edition of the tournament, organised by the world's governing body, the FIVB. It was held from 12 to 26 October 1962 in Soviet Union.

== Teams ==
No qualifications, free entrance.

Pool A

- Austria
- Brazil
- Finland
- ~~Turkey~~ (withdrew)
- Yugoslavia

Pool B

- Belgium
- Hungary
- Italy
- North Korea
- Romania

Pool C

- Albania
- East Germany
- Japan
- Poland

Pool D

- China
- Netherlands
- Soviet Union (Host)
- Tunisia

Pool E

- Bulgaria
- Czechoslovakia
- Israel
- ~~India~~ (withdrew)
- Mongolia

== Results ==
=== First round ===
==== Pool A ====
Location: Riga

Pos	Team	Pld	W	L	Pts	SW	SL	SR	SPW	SPL	SPR	Qualification
1	Yugoslavia	3	3	0	6	9	1	9.000	147	71	2.070	Final places
2	Brazil	3	2	1	5	7	3	2.333	133	95	1.400	Final places
3	Finland	3	1	2	4	3	6	0.500	90	121	0.744	11th–20th places
4	Austria	3	0	3	3	0	9	0.000	53	136	0.390	11th–20th places

Date		Score		Set 1	Set 2	Set 3	Set 4	Set 5	Total
13 Oct	Yugoslavia	3–0	Finland	15–6	15–0	15–11			45–17
13 Oct	Brazil	3–0	Austria	15–3	15–2	15–6			45–11
14 Oct	Finland	3–0	Austria	16–14	15–8	15–9			46–31
14 Oct	Yugoslavia	3–1	Brazil	15–10	15–9	12–15	15–9		57–43
15 Oct	Yugoslavia	3–0	Austria	15–3	15–6	15–2			45–11
15 Oct	Brazil	3–0	Finland	15–11	15–5	15–11			45–27

==== Pool B ====
Location: Leningrad

Pos	Team	Pld	W	L	Pts	SW	SL	SR	SPW	SPL	SPR	Qualification
1	Romania	4	4	0	8	12	3	4.000	217	113	1.920	Final places
2	Hungary	4	3	1	7	11	6	1.833	225	167	1.347	Final places
3	North Korea	4	2	2	6	8	6	1.333	156	170	0.918	11th–20th places
4	Italy	4	1	3	5	4	9	0.444	132	169	0.781	11th–20th places
5	Belgium	4	0	4	4	1	12	0.083	80	191	0.419	

Date		Score		Set 1	Set 2	Set 3	Set 4	Set 5	Total
12 Oct	Romania	3–0	Belgium	15–3	15–4	15–4			45–11
12 Oct	Hungary	3–1	North Korea	15–3	11–15	15–8	15–10		56–36
13 Oct	Hungary	3–1	Italy	15–11	15–4	14–16	15–6		59–37
13 Oct	North Korea	3–0	Belgium	15–2	15–11	15–8			45–21
14 Oct	Romania	3–1	North Korea	15–2	16–18	15–2	15–8		61–30
14 Oct	Italy	3–0	Belgium	15–6	15–10	15–4			45–20
15 Oct	Hungary	3–1	Belgium	11–15	15–5	15–7	15–1		56–28
15 Oct	Romania	3–0	Italy	15–10	15–8	15–0			45–18
16 Oct	North Korea	3–0	Italy	15–13	15–11	15–8			45–32
16 Oct	Romania	3–2	Hungary	12–15	8–15	16–14	15–4	15–6	66–54

==== Pool C ====
Location: Kiev

Pos	Team	Pld	W	L	Pts	SW	SL	SR	SPW	SPL	SPR	Qualification
1	Japan	3	3	0	6	9	1	9.000	145	101	1.436	Final places
2	Poland	3	2	1	5	7	5	1.400	174	147	1.184	Final places
3	East Germany	3	1	2	4	4	6	0.667	128	137	0.934	11th–20th places
4	Albania	3	0	3	3	1	9	0.111	84	146	0.575	11th–20th places

Date		Score		Set 1	Set 2	Set 3	Set 4	Set 5	Total
13 Oct	Japan	3–0	Albania	15–4	15–5	15–10			45–19
13 Oct	Poland	3–1	East Germany	20–18	11–15	19–17	15–4		65–54
14 Oct	East Germany	3–0	Albania	15–8	15–11	15–8			45–27
14 Oct	Japan	3–1	Poland	9–15	16–14	15–11	15–13		55–53
15 Oct	Japan	3–0	East Germany	15–11	15–13	15–5			45–29
15 Oct	Poland	3–1	Albania	15–13	11–15	15–9	15–1		56–38

==== Pool D ====
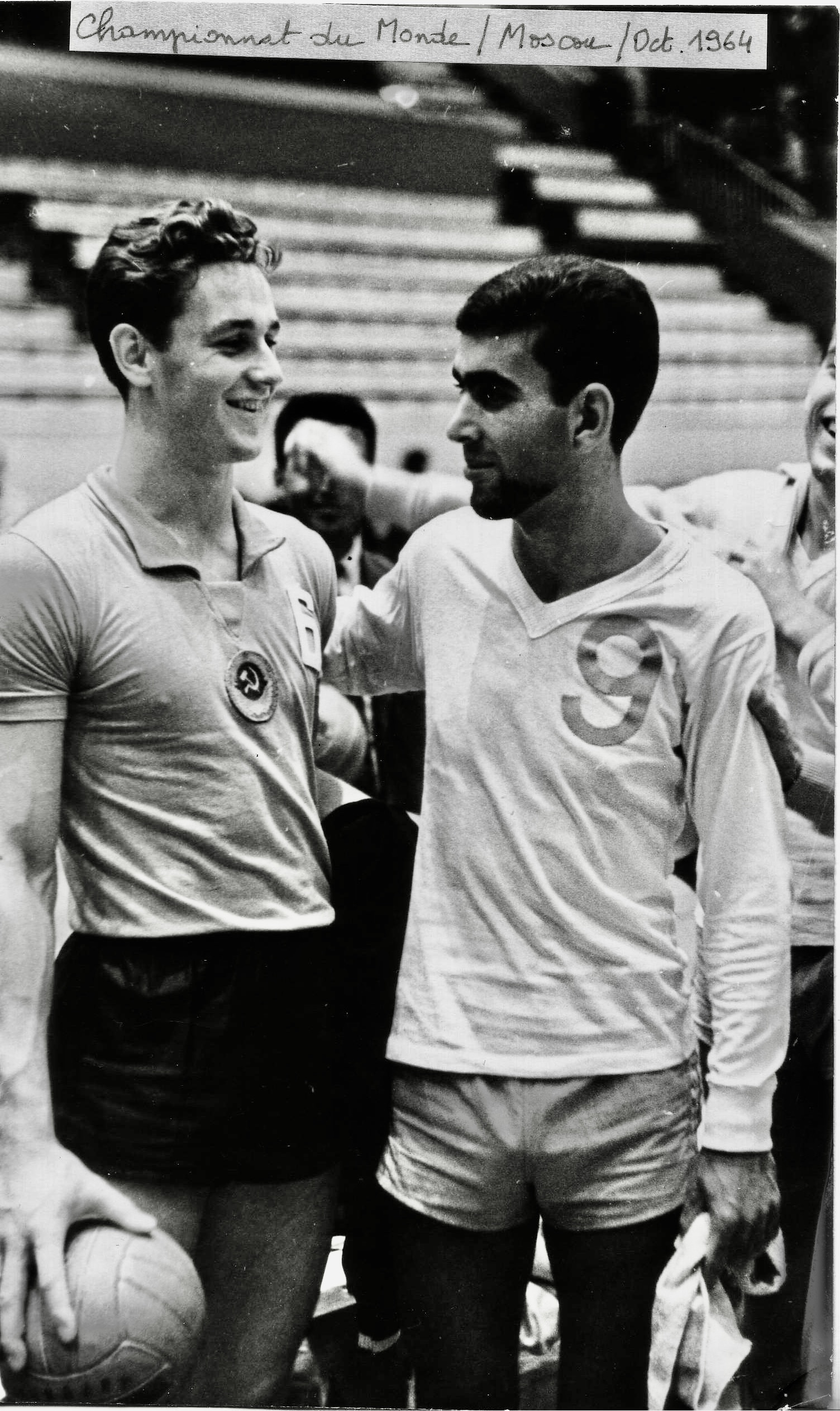
Soviet Union - Tunisia

Location: Moscow

Pos	Team	Pld	W	L	Pts	SW	SL	SR	SPW	SPL	SPR	Qualification
1	Soviet Union	3	3	0	6	9	0	MAX	136	0	MAX	Final places
2	China	3	2	1	5	6	4	1.500	135	103	1.311	Final places
3	Netherlands	3	1	2	4	4	6	0.667	96	117	0.821	11th–20th places
4	Tunisia	3	0	3	3	0	9	0.000	0	135	0.000	11th–20th places

Date		Score		Set 1	Set 2	Set 3	Set 4	Set 5	Total
12 Oct	Soviet Union	3–0	Tunisia	15–?	15–?	15–?			45–?
13 Oct	Soviet Union	3–0	Netherlands	15–0	15–4	15–6			45–10
13 Oct	China	3–0	Tunisia	15–7	15–5	15–4			45–16
14 Oct	China	3–1	Netherlands	15–9	15–7	12–15	15–10		57–41
15 Oct	Soviet Union	3–0	China	15–6	15–13	16–14			46–33
16 Oct	Netherlands	3–0	Tunisia	15–3	15–9	15–3			45–15

==== Pool E ====
Location: Moscow

Pos	Team	Pld	W	L	Pts	SW	SL	SR	SPW	SPL	SPR	Qualification
1	Czechoslovakia	3	3	0	6	9	1	9.000	149	68	2.191	Final places
2	Bulgaria	3	2	1	5	7	3	2.333	134	81	1.654	Final places
3	Mongolia	3	1	2	4	3	7	0.429	81	140	0.579	11th–20th places
4	Israel	3	0	3	3	1	9	0.111	74	149	0.497	11th–20th places

Date		Score		Set 1	Set 2	Set 3	Set 4	Set 5	Total
12 Oct	Mongolia	3–1	Israel	16–14	15–13	13–15	15–8		59–50
13 Oct	Czechoslovakia	3–1	Bulgaria	14–16	15–12	15–6	15–10		59–44
14 Oct	Czechoslovakia	3–0	Israel	15–4	15–3	15–7			45–14
15 Oct	Bulgaria	3–0	Mongolia	15–4	15–3	15–5			45–12
16 Oct	Czechoslovakia	3–0	Mongolia	15–2	15–1	15–7			45–10
16 Oct	Bulgaria	3–0	Israel	15–3	15–3	15–4			45–10

=== Final round ===
The results and the points of the matches between the same teams that were already played during the first round are taken into account for the final round.

==== 11th–20th places ====
Location: Kiev

Pos	Team	Pld	W	L	Pts	SW	SL	SR	SPW	SPL	SPR
11	East Germany	0	0	0	0	0	0	—	0	0	—
12	Netherlands	0	0	0	0	0	0	—	0	0	—
13	North Korea	0	0	0	0	0	0	—	0	0	—
14	Italy	0	0	0	0	0	0	—	0	0	—
15	Israel	0	0	0	0	0	0	—	0	0	—
16	Albania	0	0	0	0	0	0	—	0	0	—
17	Mongolia	0	0	0	0	0	0	—	0	0	—
18	Finland	0	0	0	0	0	0	—	0	0	—
19	Austria	0	0	0	0	0	0	—	0	0	—
WD	Tunisia	0	0	0	0	0	0	—	0	0	—

Date		Score		Set 1	Set 2	Set 3	Set 4	Set 5	Total
18 Oct	Italy	3–1	Finland	12–15	15–5	15–7	15–11		57–38
18 Oct	North Korea	3–0	Mongolia	15–5	15–1	15–13			45–19
18 Oct	Albania	3–0	Tunisia	15–3	15–11	15–8			45–22
18 Oct	Netherlands	3–0	Austria	15–0	15–9	15–3			45–12
18 Oct	East Germany	3–0	Israel	15–3	15–5	15–8			45–16

Date		Score		Set 1	Set 2	Set 3	Set 4	Set 5	Total
19 Oct	Mongolia	3–1	Finland	15–12	9–15	15–8	15–11		54–46
19 Oct	Tunisia	3–0	Austria	15–13	15–6	15–9			45–28
19 Oct	East Germany	3–1	North Korea	16–14	11–15	15–13	15–13		57–55
19 Oct	Netherlands	3–1	Italy	15–5	15–10	13–15	15–12		58–42
19 Oct	Israel	3–2	Albania	15–11	5–15	9–15	15–13	15–12	59–66

Date		Score		Set 1	Set 2	Set 3	Set 4	Set 5	Total
20 Oct	East Germany	3–0	Finland	15–1	15–9	15–7			45–17
20 Oct	Netherlands	3–1	Mongolia	15–5	10–15	15–2	15–13		55–35
20 Oct	North Korea	3–1	Albania	15–4	11–15	15–6	15–8		56–33
20 Oct	Italy	3–0	Austria	15–12	15–13	15–5			45–30
20 Oct	Israel	3–0	Tunisia						DNS

Date		Score		Set 1	Set 2	Set 3	Set 4	Set 5	Total
21 Oct	North Korea	3–2	Israel	15–10	8–15	15–10	8–15	15–3	61–53
21 Oct	Albania	3–1	Finland	15–8	15–13	9–15	15–12		54–48
21 Oct	Mongolia	3–1	Austria	15–7	15–11	4–15	15–0		49–33
21 Oct	East Germany	3–1	Netherlands	15–10	11–15	16–14	15–5		57–44

Date		Score		Set 1	Set 2	Set 3	Set 4	Set 5	Total
23 Oct	East Germany	3–0	Austria	15–3	15–0	15–0			45–3
23 Oct	Israel	3–0	Finland	17–15	15–8	15–6			47–29
23 Oct	Netherlands	3–0	Albania	15–12	15–5	17–15			47–32
23 Oct	Italy	3–0	Mongolia	15–1	15–5	15–8			45–14

Date		Score		Set 1	Set 2	Set 3	Set 4	Set 5	Total
24 Oct	Albania	3–0	Austria	15–4	15–5	15–2			45–11
24 Oct	North Korea	3–1	Finland	15–5	15–6	9–15	15–3		54–29
24 Oct	Netherlands	3–1	Israel	12–15	15–8	15–6	15–11		57–40
24 Oct	East Germany	3–1	Italy	15–11	13–15	15–6	15–8		58–40

Date		Score		Set 1	Set 2	Set 3	Set 4	Set 5	Total
25 Oct	Netherlands	3–1	North Korea	15–10	15–7	10–15	15–11		55–43
25 Oct	Israel	3–0	Austria	15–8	15–8	15–8			45–24
25 Oct	Italy	3–1	Albania	15–12	15–11	7–15	15–8		52–46
25 Oct	East Germany	3–0	Mongolia	15–5	15–6	15–6			45–17

Date		Score		Set 1	Set 2	Set 3	Set 4	Set 5	Total
26 Oct	North Korea	3–0	Austria	15–3	15–1	15–0			45–4
26 Oct	Albania	3–0	Mongolia	15–8	15–13	15–5			45–26
26 Oct	Israel	3–1	Italy	10–15	15–9	16–14	15–11		56–49
26 Oct	Netherlands	3–0	Finland	15–4	15–10	15–5			45–19

==== Final places ====
Pos	Team	Pld	W	L	Pts	SW	SL	SR	SPW	SPL	SPR
1	Soviet Union	9	9	0	18	27	6	4.500	482	327	1.474
2	Czechoslovakia	9	7	2	16	22	15	1.467	491	421	1.166
3	Romania	9	6	3	15	23	16	1.438	512	461	1.111
4	Bulgaria	9	6	3	15	21	19	1.105	534	523	1.021
5	Japan	9	5	4	14	20	20	1.000	474	488	0.971
6	Poland	9	3	6	12	17	18	0.944	452	447	1.011
7	Hungary	9	3	6	12	18	21	0.857	444	478	0.929
8	Yugoslavia	9	3	6	12	17	21	0.810	434	496	0.875
9	China	9	3	6	12	14	24	0.583	445	494	0.901
10	Brazil	9	0	9	9	8	27	0.296	345	478	0.722

Date		Score		Set 1	Set 2	Set 3	Set 4	Set 5	Total
18 Oct	Soviet Union	3–2	Japan	10–15	15–3	15–10	14–16	15–1	69–45
18 Oct	Czechoslovakia	3–2	Brazil	9–15	15–7	15–11	8–15	15–10	62–58
18 Oct	Poland	3–0	Yugoslavia	15–5	15–8	15–4			45–17
18 Oct	Romania	3–2	China	9–15	15–17	15–8	15–3	15–4	69–47
18 Oct	Bulgaria	3–2	Hungary	15–7	5–15	15–11	5–15	15–12	55–60

Date		Score		Set 1	Set 2	Set 3	Set 4	Set 5	Total
19 Oct	Japan	3–2	Yugoslavia	15–5	9–15	12–15	15–9	15–1	66–45
19 Oct	China	3–2	Bulgaria	7–15	15–13	11–15	17–15	15–5	65–63
19 Oct	Czechoslovakia	3–2	Poland	14–16	12–15	15–9	15–7	16–14	72–61
19 Oct	Hungary	3–1	Brazil	5–15	15–6	15–4	15–13		50–38
19 Oct	Soviet Union	3–1	Romania	15–17	15–8	15–6	15–11		60–42

Date		Score		Set 1	Set 2	Set 3	Set 4	Set 5	Total
20 Oct	Hungary	3–1	Poland	11–15	15–13	15–13	15–11		56–52
20 Oct	China	3–2	Brazil	15–9	15–9	13–15	12–15	15–9	70–57
20 Oct	Soviet Union	3–1	Yugoslavia	15–9	15–13	10–15	15–13		55–50
20 Oct	Bulgaria	3–2	Romania	11–15	19–17	13–15	15–12	16–14	74–73
20 Oct	Czechoslovakia	3–0	Japan	18–16	15–12	17–15			50–43

Date		Score		Set 1	Set 2	Set 3	Set 4	Set 5	Total
21 Oct	Japan	3–2	Hungary	12–15	6–15	15–9	15–11	15–7	63–57
21 Oct	Poland	3–0	China	18–16	16–14	15–8			49–38
21 Oct	Romania	3–0	Brazil	15–6	15–11	15–11			45–28
21 Oct	Soviet Union	3–0	Bulgaria	15–12	18–16	15–10			48–38
21 Oct	Czechoslovakia	3–1	Yugoslavia	15–3	15–1	5–15	15–9		50–28

Date		Score		Set 1	Set 2	Set 3	Set 4	Set 5	Total
23 Oct	Bulgaria	3–1	Brazil	15–11	15–9	7–15	15–8		52–43
23 Oct	Yugoslavia	3–1	Hungary	15–9	14–16	15–12	15–13		59–50
23 Oct	Romania	3–0	Poland	15–8	15–10	17–15			47–33
23 Oct	China	3–2	Japan	15–6	11–15	15–3	6–15	15–6	62–45
23 Oct	Soviet Union	3–0	Czechoslovakia	15–8	15–13	15–9			45–30

Date		Score		Set 1	Set 2	Set 3	Set 4	Set 5	Total
24 Oct	Yugoslavia	3–1	China	15–10	11–15	16–14	15–10		57–49
24 Oct	Japan	3–2	Romania	15–11	4–15	12–15	15–3	15–7	61–51
24 Oct	Soviet Union	3–0	Brazil	15–4	15–3	15–12			45–19
24 Oct	Czechoslovakia	3–2	Hungary	10–15	15–11	15–2	7–15	15–2	62–45
24 Oct	Bulgaria	3–2	Poland	15–9	13–15	16–18	15–11	15–10	74–63

Date		Score		Set 1	Set 2	Set 3	Set 4	Set 5	Total
25 Oct	Soviet Union	3–0	Hungary	15–10	15–3	15–6			45–19
25 Oct	Bulgaria	3–1	Japan	14–16	17–15	15–5	15–8		61–44
25 Oct	Poland	3–0	Brazil	15–8	15–3	15–8			45–19
25 Oct	Czechoslovakia	3–1	China	15–10	15–5	10–15	15–13		55–43
25 Oct	Romania	3–2	Yugoslavia	12–15	15–11	15–8	8–15	15–4	65–53

Date		Score		Set 1	Set 2	Set 3	Set 4	Set 5	Total
26 Oct	Japan	3–1	Brazil	15–3	15–10	7–15	15–12		52–40
26 Oct	Bulgaria	3–2	Yugoslavia	15–11	16–14	13–15	14–16	15–12	73–68
26 Oct	Hungary	3–1	China	8–15	15–6	15–5	15–12		53–38
26 Oct	Romania	3–1	Czechoslovakia	9–15	15–11	15–13	15–12		54–51
26 Oct	Soviet Union	3–2	Poland	10–15	15–9	15–4	14–16	15–7	69–51

== Final standing ==
Rank	Team
1st place, gold medalist(s)	Soviet Union
2nd place, silver medalist(s)	Czechoslovakia
3rd place, bronze medalist(s)	Romania
4	Bulgaria
5	Japan
6	Poland
7	Hungary
8	Yugoslavia
9	China
10	Brazil
11	East Germany
12	Netherlands
13	North Korea
14	Italy
15	Israel
16	Albania
17	Mongolia
18	Finland
19	Austria
20	Belgium
WD	Tunisia

1962 Men's World champions

Soviet Union
4th title
