= 1949 FIVB Men's Volleyball World Championship =

1949 FIVB World Championship
Tournament details
- Host country: Czechoslovakia
- Dates: 10–18 September
- Teams: 10
- Venue: 1 (in 1 host city)
- Officially opened by: Klement Gottwald

Final positions
- Champions: Soviet Union (1st title)

The 1949 FIVB Men's World Championship was the first edition of the tournament, organised by the world's governing body, the FIVB. It was held from 10 to 18 September 1949 in Prague, Czechoslovakia.

== Teams ==
Pool A	Pool B	Pool C
Czechoslovakia (Host)	France	Soviet Union
Poland	Bulgaria	Romania
Netherlands	Italy	Hungary
~~Uruguay~~	~~Yugoslavia~~	Belgium

- Uruguay and Yugoslavia refused to participate

== Results ==
=== First round ===
==== Pool A ====
Pos	Team	Pld	W	L	Pts	SW	SL	SR	SPW	SPL	SPR	Qualification
1	Czechoslovakia	2	2	0	4	6	0	MAX	90	21	4.286	1st–6th places
2	Poland	2	1	1	3	3	3	1.000	65	58	1.121	1st–6th places
3	Netherlands	2	0	2	2	0	6	0.000	14	90	0.156	7th–10th places

Date		Score		Set 1	Set 2	Set 3	Set 4	Set 5	Total
10 Sep	Poland	3–0	Netherlands	15–2	15–7	15–4			45–13
11 Sep	Czechoslovakia	3–0	Poland	15–5	15–10	15–5			45–20
13 Sep	Czechoslovakia	3–0	Netherlands	15–0	15–0	15–1			45–1

==== Pool B ====
Pos	Team	Pld	W	L	Pts	SW	SL	SR	SPW	SPL	SPR	Qualification
1	Bulgaria	2	2	0	4	6	1	6.000	103	52	1.981	1st–6th places
2	France	2	1	1	3	3	4	0.750	76	89	0.854	1st–6th places
3	Italy	2	0	2	2	2	6	0.333	79	117	0.675	7th–10th places

Date		Score		Set 1	Set 2	Set 3	Set 4	Set 5	Total
10 Sep	Bulgaria	3–1	Italy	15–7	13–15	15–4	15–9		58–35
11 Sep	Bulgaria	3–0	France	15–8	15–7	15–2			45–17
13 Sep	France	3–1	Italy	14–16	15–10	15–5	15–13		59–44

==== Pool C ====
Pos	Team	Pld	W	L	Pts	SW	SL	SR	SPW	SPL	SPR	Qualification
1	Soviet Union	3	3	0	6	9	0	MAX	136	57	2.386	1st–6th places
2	Romania	3	2	1	5	6	5	1.200	129	127	1.016	1st–6th places
3	Hungary	3	1	2	4	5	6	0.833	131	128	1.023	7th–10th places
4	Belgium	3	0	3	3	0	9	0.000	51	135	0.378	7th–10th places

Date		Score		Set 1	Set 2	Set 3	Set 4	Set 5	Total
11 Sep	Romania	3–2	Hungary	12–15	15–6	16–14	1–15	16–14	60–64
11 Sep	Soviet Union	3–0	Belgium	15–1	15–6	15–4			45–11
12 Sep	Hungary	3–0	Belgium	15–8	15–13	15–2			45–23
12 Sep	Soviet Union	3–0	Romania	15–4	15–6	16–14			46–24
13 Sep	Soviet Union	3–0	Hungary	15–9	15–4	15–9			45–22
13 Sep	Romania	3–0	Belgium	15–4	15–4	15–9			45–17

=== Final round ===
==== 7th–10th places ====
Pos	Team	Pld	W	L	Pts	SW	SL	SR	SPW	SPL	SPR
7	Hungary	3	3	0	6	9	1	9.000	149	69	2.159
8	Italy	3	2	1	5	6	3	2.000	114	77	1.481
9	Belgium	3	1	2	4	3	6	0.500	75	113	0.664
10	Netherlands	3	0	3	3	1	9	0.111	70	149	0.470

Date		Score		Set 1	Set 2	Set 3	Set 4	Set 5	Total
14 Sep	Hungary	3–1	Netherlands	15–3	15–3	14–16	15–6		59–28
15 Sep	Italy	3–0	Belgium	15–4	15–3	15–6			45–13
16 Sep	Italy	3–0	Netherlands	15–2	15–11	15–6			45–19
17 Sep	Hungary	3–0	Italy	15–12	15–2	15–10			45–24
17 Sep	Belgium	3–0	Netherlands	15–4	15–6	15–13			45–23
18 Sep	Hungary	3–0	Belgium	15–4	15–10	15–3			45–17

==== 1st–6th places ====
Pos	Team	Pld	W	L	Pts	SW	SL	SR	SPW	SPL	SPR
1	Soviet Union	5	5	0	10	15	2	7.500	256	135	1.896
2	Czechoslovakia	5	4	1	9	13	3	4.333	230	119	1.933
3	Bulgaria	5	3	2	8	9	9	1.000	190	225	0.844
4	Romania	5	2	3	7	8	11	0.727	211	239	0.883
5	Poland	5	1	4	6	6	12	0.500	178	239	0.745
6	France	5	0	5	5	1	15	0.067	131	239	0.548

Date		Score		Set 1	Set 2	Set 3	Set 4	Set 5	Total
14 Sep	Soviet Union	3–0	Poland	15–9	15–5	15–6			45–20
14 Sep	Bulgaria	3–0	France	15–10	16–14	15–11			46–35
14 Sep	Czechoslovakia	3–0	Romania	15–6	15–7	15–8			45–21
15 Sep	Soviet Union	3–0	Bulgaria	15–8	15–4	15–1			45–13
15 Sep	Romania	3–1	France	15–8	11–15	15–11	15–11		56–45
15 Sep	Czechoslovakia	3–0	Poland	15–7	15–3	15–2			45–12
16 Sep	Soviet Union	3–0	France	15–4	15–1	15–8			45–13
16 Sep	Romania	3–1	Poland	9–15	15–6	15–10	15–9		54–40
16 Sep	Czechoslovakia	3–0	Bulgaria	15–8	15–1	15–8			45–17
17 Sep	Bulgaria	3–2	Poland	13–15	15–12	15–10	6–15	15–7	64–59
17 Sep	Czechoslovakia	3–0	France	15–2	15–1	15–4			45–7
17 Sep	Soviet Union	3–1	Romania	14–16	15–6	15–6	15–11		59–39
18 Sep	Poland	3–0	France	17–15	15–10	15–6			47–31
18 Sep	Soviet Union	3–1	Czechoslovakia	15–7	15–11	17–19	15–13		62–50
18 Sep	Bulgaria	3–1	Romania	15–9	15–5	5–15	15–12		50–41

== Final standing ==
Rank	Team
1st place, gold medalist(s)	Soviet Union
2nd place, silver medalist(s)	Czechoslovakia
3rd place, bronze medalist(s)	Bulgaria
4	Romania
5	Poland
6	France
7	Hungary
8	Italy
9	Belgium
10	Netherlands

1949 Men's World champions

Soviet Union
1st title

Team roster
Einhorn, Kitayev, Mikheyev, Nefedov, Pimenov, Reva, Savin, Shagin, Ulyanov, Vasilchikov, Voronin, Yakushev
Head coach
Berlyand
