= 1950 Men's European Volleyball Championship =

1950 Европейско първенство по волейбол (Bulgarian)

Tournament details
- Host country: Bulgaria
- City: (Bulgaria) Sofia
- Dates: 14–22 October
- Teams: 6 (from 1 confederation)
- Venue: Velodrome in Sofia

Final positions
- Champions: Soviet Union (1st title)
- Runners-up: Czechoslovakia
- Third place: Hungary
- Fourth place: Bulgaria

Tournament statistics
- Matches played: 15

The 1950 Men's European Volleyball Championship was the 2nd edition of the Men's European Volleyball Championship. The 2nd edition of this Championship was oganized by the European Volleyball governing body under the FIVB after they got established in 1947.

The tournament took place from the 14th to the 22nd of October 1950 in Sofia, Bulgaria. Six countries participated in the tournament: Bulgaria, Czechoslovakia, Hungary, Poland, Romania, and Soviet Union.

The tournament was played as a round robin, with each team facing every other team once. A total of 15 matches were played, with the final standings determining the European champion. The championship was held at the Velodrome in Sofia.

Soviet Union became the 2nd European Champions after taking the crown from Czechoslovakia, finishing the tournament with a perfect 5-0 record and a 15-0 set record.Czechoslovakia had to settle for a silver medal.

== Teams ==
In the 1950 Men's European Volleyball Championship there were six countries who participated in the tournament. Czechoslovakia returned to the tournament as defending champions. The other five countries are debutants to the Men's European Volleyball Championship

=== Summary of qualified teams ===
Team	Information	Appearance(s)			Previous best performance (Note: Bold text indicates they hosted that edition.)
Team	Information	Total	First	Last	Previous best performance
Bulgaria	Host	Debut			
Czechoslovakia	Defending Champion	2nd	1948		Champions (1948)
Hungary	Debut				
Poland	Debut				
Romania	Debut				
Soviet Union	Debut				

== Overview of venue ==
The venue used for the 1950 Men's European Volleyball Championship was a Velodrome in Sofia. This was an outdoor velodrome/cycling track, which has been subsequently adapted temporarily for the 1950 Men's European Volleyball Championship, with volleyball courts laid out on the ground.

Tournament venue information

Venue	Games
(Bulgaria) Sofia Velodrome	15

(Bulgaria) Sofia
Velodrome
Capacity: 5,000~10,000

== Round Robin ==
- Match won: 2 match point rewarded to the winner
- Match loss: 1 match point rewarded to the loser

=== Pool ===
Pos	Team	Pld	W	L	Pts	SW	SL	SR	SPW	SPL	SPR
1	Soviet Union	5	5	0	10	15	0	MAX	225	88	2.557
2	Czechoslovakia	5	4	1	9	12	6	2.000	243	199	1.221
3	Hungary	5	3	2	8	9	9	1.000	213	224	0.951
4	Bulgaria	5	2	3	7	10	10	1.000	258	269	0.959
5	Romania	5	1	4	6	4	13	0.308	177	237	0.747
6	Poland	5	0	5	5	3	15	0.200	168	267	0.629

Source: CEV

==== Matches ====
Date	Time		Score		Set 1	Set 2	Set 3	Set 4	Set 5	Total	Report
14 Oct		Soviet Union	3–0	Romania	15–5	15–6	15–6			45–17	Report
15 Oct		Czechoslovakia	3–1	Poland	15–12	15–9	14–16	15–7		59–44	Report
15 Oct		Hungary	3–2	Bulgaria	8–15	10–15	17–15	16–14	17–15	68–74	Report
17 Oct		Soviet Union	3–0	Poland	15–5	15–5	15–7			45–17	Report
17 Oct		Hungary	3–0	Romania	15–10	15–7	15–5			45–22	Report
18 Oct		Soviet Union	3–0	Hungary	15–5	15–6	15–4			45–15	Report
19 Oct		Czechoslovakia	3–0	Romania	15–12	15–2	15–9			45–23	Report
19 Oct		Bulgaria	3–0	Poland	15–7	15–6	16–14			46–27	Report
20 Oct		Bulgaria	3–1	Romania	18–16	15–12	10–15	17–15		60–58	Report
20 Oct		Soviet Union	3–0	Czechoslovakia	15–9	15–7	15–7			45–23	Report
21 Oct		Hungary	3–1	Poland	15–6	15–17	15–7	15–8		60–38	Report
21 Oct		Czechoslovakia	3–2	Bulgaria	12–15	15–10	15–11	14–16	15–10	71–62	Report
22 Oct		Romania	3–1	Poland	11–15	16–14	15–7	15–6		57–42	Report
22 Oct		Czechoslovakia	3–0	Hungary	15–12	15–9	15–4			45–25	Report
22 Oct		Soviet Union	3–0	Bulgaria	15–6	15–9	15–1			45–16	Report

== Final Standing ==
1950 Men's European champions

Soviet Union
First title

Pos	Team	Pld	W	L	Pts	SW	SL	SR	SPW	SPL	SPR
1	Soviet Union	5	5	0	10	15	0	MAX	225	88	2.557
2	Czechoslovakia	5	4	1	9	12	6	2.000	243	199	1.221
3	Hungary	5	3	2	8	9	9	1.000	213	224	0.951
4	Bulgaria	5	2	3	7	10	10	1.000	258	269	0.959
5	Romania	5	1	4	6	4	13	0.308	177	237	0.747
6	Poland	5	0	5	5	3	15	0.200	168	267	0.629

Source: CEV
