= 1983 Men's European Volleyball Championship =

Tournament details
- Host country: East Germany
- Dates: September 17–25
- Teams: 12
- Venues: 3 (in 3 host cities)

Final positions
- Champions: Soviet Union (9th title)

The 1983 Men's European Volleyball Championship was the thirteenth edition of the event, organized by Europe's governing volleyball body, the Confédération Européenne de Volleyball. It was hosted in several cities in East Germany from September 17 to September 25, 1983.

== Teams ==
Group A – Erfurt

- Czechoslovakia
- Finland
- Netherlands
- Soviet Union

Group B – Suhl

- France
- Italy
- Poland
- Romania

Group C – East Berlin

- Bulgaria
- East Germany
- Greece
- Hungary

== Final ranking ==
Place	Team
1st place, gold medalist(s)	Soviet Union
2nd place, silver medalist(s)	Poland
3rd place, bronze medalist(s)	Bulgaria
4.	Italy
5.	Czechoslovakia
6.	East Germany
7.	Finland
8.	Romania
9.	Greece
10.	Netherlands
11.	Hungary
12.	France

1983 Men's European champions

Soviet Union
Ninth title
