= 1986 FIVB Men's Volleyball World Championship =

International volleyball competitions hosted by France

1986 FIVB World Championship
Tournament details
- Host country: France
- Dates: 24 September – 5 October
- Teams: 16
- Venues: 8 (in 8 host cities)
- Officially opened by: François Mitterrand

Final positions
- Champions: United States (1st title)

Tournament awards
- MVP: (France) Philippe Blain

The 1986 FIVB Men's World Championship was the eleventh edition of the tournament, organised by the world's governing body, the FIVB. It was held from 24 September to 5 October 1986 in France.

== Qualification ==
Means of qualification	Date	Host	Vacancies	Qualified
Host country	—N/a	—N/a	1	France
1982 FIVB Men's Volleyball World Championship	1–15 October 1982	Argentina	7	Soviet Union
1982 FIVB Men's Volleyball World Championship	1–15 October 1982	Argentina	7	Brazil
1982 FIVB Men's Volleyball World Championship	1–15 October 1982	Argentina	7	Argentina
1982 FIVB Men's Volleyball World Championship	1–15 October 1982	Argentina	7	Japan
1982 FIVB Men's Volleyball World Championship	1–15 October 1982	Argentina	7	Bulgaria
1982 FIVB Men's Volleyball World Championship	1–15 October 1982	Argentina	7	Poland
1982 FIVB Men's Volleyball World Championship	1–15 October 1982	Argentina	7	China
1985 Men's European Volleyball Championship	29 Sep – 4 Oct 1985	Netherlands	1	Czechoslovakia
1985 Men's NORCECA Volleyball Championship	27 Sep – 7 Oct 1985	(Dominican Republic) Santiago de los Caballeros	1	United States
1985 Men's South American Volleyball Championship	24 Jul – 1 Aug 1985	(Venezuela) Caracas	1	Venezuela
Asian Qualifier	5–7 October 1985	(Australia) Sydney	1	Chinese Taipei
1983 Men's African Volleyball Championship	7–14 December 1983	(Egypt) Port Said	1	Egypt
1986 FIVB Men's Volleyball World B Championship	3–12 April 1986	(Greece) Piraeus	3	Cuba
1986 FIVB Men's Volleyball World B Championship	3–12 April 1986	(Greece) Piraeus	3	Italy
1986 FIVB Men's Volleyball World B Championship	3–12 April 1986	(Greece) Piraeus	3	Greece
Total			16	

== Results ==
=== First round ===
==== Pool A ====
Location: Montpellier

Pos	Team	Pld	W	L	Pts	SW	SL	SR	SPW	SPL	SPR	Qualification
1	France	3	3	0	6	9	0	MAX	136	54	2.519	1st–12th pools
2	Italy	3	2	1	5	6	3	2.000	118	89	1.326	1st–12th pools
3	China	3	1	2	4	3	6	0.500	83	113	0.735	1st–12th pools
4	Venezuela	3	0	3	3	0	9	0.000	54	135	0.400	13th–16th places

Date	Time		Score		Set 1	Set 2	Set 3	Set 4	Set 5	Total
24 Sep	17:30	France	3–0	Venezuela	15–2	15–4	15–3			45–9
24 Sep	20:00	Italy	3–0	China	15–1	15–10	15–10			45–21
25 Sep	17:30	Italy	3–0	Venezuela	15–10	15–2	15–10			45–22
25 Sep	20:00	France	3–0	China	15–6	15–6	15–5			45–17
26 Sep	17:30	China	3–0	Venezuela	15–4	15–12	15–7			45–23
26 Sep	20:00	France	3–0	Italy	16–14	15–7	15–7			46–28

==== Pool B ====
Location: Tourcoing

Pos	Team	Pld	W	L	Pts	SW	SL	SR	SPW	SPL	SPR	Qualification
1	Soviet Union	3	3	0	6	9	1	9.000	144	68	2.118	1st–12th pools
2	Cuba	3	2	1	5	7	4	1.750	146	111	1.315	1st–12th pools
3	Poland	3	1	2	4	4	6	0.667	97	129	0.752	1st–12th pools
4	Chinese Taipei	3	0	3	3	0	9	0.000	56	135	0.415	13th–16th places

Date	Time		Score		Set 1	Set 2	Set 3	Set 4	Set 5	Total
24 Sep	17:30	Soviet Union	3–0	Chinese Taipei	15–2	15–4	15–6			45–12
24 Sep	20:00	Cuba	3–1	Poland	15–5	17–15	11–15	15–4		58–39
25 Sep	17:30	Cuba	3–0	Chinese Taipei	15–7	15–2	15–9			45–18
25 Sep	20:00	Soviet Union	3–0	Poland	15–7	15–2	15–4			45–13
26 Sep	17:30	Poland	3–0	Chinese Taipei	15–11	15–4	15–11			45–26
26 Sep	20:00	Soviet Union	3–1	Cuba	15–7	15–12	9–15	15–9		54–43

==== Pool C ====
Location: Clermont-Ferrand

Pos	Team	Pld	W	L	Pts	SW	SL	SR	SPW	SPL	SPR	Qualification
1	Brazil	3	3	0	6	9	1	9.000	148	87	1.701	1st–12th pools
2	Bulgaria	3	2	1	5	7	3	2.333	131	116	1.129	1st–12th pools
3	Czechoslovakia	3	1	2	4	3	6	0.500	112	115	0.974	1st–12th pools
4	Egypt	3	0	3	3	0	9	0.000	62	135	0.459	13th–16th places

Date	Time		Score		Set 1	Set 2	Set 3	Set 4	Set 5	Total
24 Sep	17:30	Brazil	3–0	Egypt	15–6	15–8	15–3			45–17
24 Sep	20:00	Bulgaria	3–0	Czechoslovakia	15–12	17–15	15–11			47–36
25 Sep	17:30	Czechoslovakia	3–0	Egypt	15–5	15–10	15–7			45–22
25 Sep	20:00	Brazil	3–1	Bulgaria	16–14	11–15	15–6	15–4		57–39
26 Sep	17:30	Bulgaria	3–0	Egypt	15–5	15–11	15–7			45–23
26 Sep	20:00	Brazil	3–0	Czechoslovakia	15–12	16–14	15–5			46–31

==== Pool D ====
Location: Orléans

Pos	Team	Pld	W	L	Pts	SW	SL	SR	SPW	SPL	SPR	Qualification
1	United States	3	3	0	6	9	1	9.000	146	88	1.659	1st–12th pools
2	Argentina	3	2	1	5	6	3	2.000	117	85	1.376	1st–12th pools
3	Japan	3	1	2	4	4	6	0.667	114	118	0.966	1st–12th pools
4	Greece	3	0	3	3	0	9	0.000	49	135	0.363	13th–16th places

Date	Time		Score		Set 1	Set 2	Set 3	Set 4	Set 5	Total
24 Sep	17:30	Argentina	3–0	Greece	15–6	15–3	15–6			45–15
24 Sep	20:00	United States	3–1	Japan	9–15	15–8	17–15	15–6		56–44
25 Sep	17:30	Argentina	3–0	Japan	15–8	15–13	15–4			45–25
25 Sep	20:00	United States	3–0	Greece	15–6	15–7	15–4			45–17
26 Sep	17:30	Japan	3–0	Greece	15–8	15–3	15–6			45–17
26 Sep	20:00	United States	3–0	Argentina	15–10	15–7	15–10			45–27

=== Second round ===
The results and the points of the matches between the same teams that were already played during the first round are taken into account for the second round.

==== 1st–12th pools ====
===== Pool E =====
Location: Toulouse

Pos	Team	Pld	W	L	Pts	SW	SL	SR	SPW	SPL	SPR	Qualification
1	Brazil	5	5	0	10	15	3	5.000	261	183	1.426	Semifinals
2	Bulgaria	5	4	1	9	13	4	3.250	232	186	1.247	Semifinals
3	France	5	3	2	8	11	6	1.833	233	186	1.253	5th–8th places
4	Czechoslovakia	5	2	3	7	6	9	0.667	188	192	0.979	5th–8th places
5	Italy	5	1	4	6	3	12	0.250	148	202	0.733	9th–12th places
6	China	5	0	5	5	1	15	0.067	126	239	0.527	9th–12th places

Date		Score		Set 1	Set 2	Set 3	Set 4	Set 5	Total
29 Sep	Brazil	3–1	China	12–15	15–6	15–7	15–4		57–32
29 Sep	Bulgaria	3–0	Italy	15–4	15–10	15–12			45–26
29 Sep	France	3–0	Czechoslovakia	15–10	15–13	15–6			45–29
30 Sep	Czechoslovakia	3–0	China	15–9	15–10	17–15			47–34
30 Sep	Brazil	3–0	Italy	15–6	15–13	15–10			45–29
30 Sep	Bulgaria	3–1	France	15–9	11–15	15–12	15–9		56–45
1 Oct	Czechoslovakia	3–0	Italy	15–8	15–8	15–4			45–20
1 Oct	Bulgaria	3–0	China	15–8	15–3	15–11			45–22
1 Oct	Brazil	3–1	France	15–13	6–15	20–18	15–6		56–52

===== Pool F =====
Location: Nantes

Pos	Team	Pld	W	L	Pts	SW	SL	SR	SPW	SPL	SPR	Qualification
1	Soviet Union	5	5	0	10	15	2	7.500	244	161	1.516	Semifinals
2	United States	5	4	1	9	13	5	2.600	253	198	1.278	Semifinals
3	Cuba	5	3	2	8	11	10	1.100	265	269	0.985	5th–8th places
4	Argentina	5	2	3	7	8	11	0.727	224	231	0.970	5th–8th places
5	Poland	5	1	4	6	6	12	0.500	182	228	0.798	9th–12th places
6	Japan	5	0	5	5	2	15	0.133	171	252	0.679	9th–12th places

Date		Score		Set 1	Set 2	Set 3	Set 4	Set 5	Total
29 Sep	Soviet Union	3–0	Japan	16–14	15–5	15–10			46–29
29 Sep	United States	3–0	Poland	15–12	15–13	15–11			45–36
29 Sep	Cuba	3–2	Argentina	15–17	15–4	15–12	7–15	15–13	67–61
30 Sep	Poland	3–0	Japan	15–7	15–10	15–2			45–19
30 Sep	United States	3–1	Cuba	15–7	16–18	15–5	15–7		61–37
30 Sep	Soviet Union	3–0	Argentina	15–11	15–10	15–9			45–30
1 Oct	Argentina	3–2	Poland	15–7	10–15	6–15	15–4	15–8	61–49
1 Oct	Cuba	3–1	Japan	11–15	15–12	15–10	19–17		60–54
1 Oct	Soviet Union	3–1	United States	15–10	15–9	9–15	15–12		54–46

==== 13th–16th places ====
Location: Évreux

Pos	Team	Pld	W	L	Pts	SW	SL	SR	SPW	SPL	SPR
13	Greece	3	3	0	6	9	2	4.500	159	121	1.314
14	Egypt	3	1	2	4	7	7	1.000	182	174	1.046
15	Chinese Taipei	3	1	2	4	4	7	0.571	128	134	0.955
16	Venezuela	3	1	2	4	4	8	0.500	126	166	0.759

Date		Score		Set 1	Set 2	Set 3	Set 4	Set 5	Total
29 Sep	Greece	3–0	Chinese Taipei	15–10	15–11	15–12			45–33
29 Sep	Venezuela	3–2	Egypt	15–11	6–15	15–11	17–19	15–7	68–63
30 Sep	Chinese Taipei	3–1	Venezuela	15–5	12–15	15–10	15–3		57–33
30 Sep	Greece	3–2	Egypt	11–15	15–8	12–15	15–13	15–12	68–63
1 Oct	Egypt	3–1	Chinese Taipei	9–15	17–15	15–6	15–2		56–38
1 Oct	Greece	3–0	Venezuela	15–3	15–8	16–14			46–25

=== Final round ===
==== 9th–12th places ====
9th–12th semifinals
4 October – Paris
Poland	3
China	0
4 October – Paris
Japan	3
Italy	2

9th place
5 October – Paris
Poland	3
Japan	0
11th place
5 October – Paris
China	0
Italy	3

===== 9th–12th semifinals =====
Date		Score		Set 1	Set 2	Set 3	Set 4	Set 5	Total
4 Oct	Poland	3–0	China	15–11	15–10	15–3			45–24
4 Oct	Japan	3–2	Italy	13–15	11–15	15–11	15–9	15–10	69–60

===== 11th place match =====
Date		Score		Set 1	Set 2	Set 3	Set 4	Set 5	Total
5 Oct	China	0–3	Italy	7–15	8–15	13–15			28–45

===== 9th place match =====
Date		Score		Set 1	Set 2	Set 3	Set 4	Set 5	Total
5 Oct	Poland	3–0	Japan	15–11	15–12	15–8			45–31

==== 5th–8th places ====
5th–8th semifinals
4 October – Paris
Cuba	3
Czechoslovakia	1
4 October – Paris
France	3
Argentina	1

5th place
5 October – Paris
Cuba	3
France	1
7th place
5 October – Paris
Czechoslovakia	0
Argentina	3

===== 5th–8th semifinals =====
Date		Score		Set 1	Set 2	Set 3	Set 4	Set 5	Total
4 Oct	Cuba	3–1	Czechoslovakia	17–15	15–7	14–16	15–8		61–46
4 Oct	France	3–1	Argentina	15–12	15–10	10–15	15–13		55–50

===== 7th place match =====
Date		Score		Set 1	Set 2	Set 3	Set 4	Set 5	Total
5 Oct	Czechoslovakia	0–3	Argentina	11–15	10–15	6–15			27–45

===== 5th place match =====
Date		Score		Set 1	Set 2	Set 3	Set 4	Set 5	Total
5 Oct	Cuba	3–1	France	15–10	6–15	15–12	15–12		51–49

==== Finals ====
Semifinals
4 October – Paris
Soviet Union	3
Bulgaria	0
4 October – Paris
United States	3
Brazil	0

Final
5 October – Paris
Soviet Union	1
United States	3
3rd place
5 October – Paris
Bulgaria	3
Brazil	0

===== Semifinals =====
Date		Score		Set 1	Set 2	Set 3	Set 4	Set 5	Total
4 Oct	Soviet Union	3–0	Bulgaria	15–8	15–2	15–13			45–23
4 Oct	United States	3–0	Brazil	15–5	15–9	15–3			45–17

===== 3rd place match =====
Date		Score		Set 1	Set 2	Set 3	Set 4	Set 5	Total
5 Oct	Bulgaria	3–0	Brazil	16–14	15–5	15–8			46–27

===== Final =====
Date		Score		Set 1	Set 2	Set 3	Set 4	Set 5	Total
5 Oct	Soviet Union	1–3	United States	15–12	11–15	8–15	12–15		46–57

== Final standing ==
Rank	Team
1st place, gold medalist(s)	United States
2nd place, silver medalist(s)	Soviet Union
3rd place, bronze medalist(s)	Bulgaria
4	Brazil
5	Cuba
6	France
7	Argentina
8	Czechoslovakia
9	Poland
10	Japan
11	Italy
12	China
13	Greece
14	Egypt
15	Chinese Taipei
16	Venezuela

1986 Men's World champions

United States
1st title

Team roster
Dusty Dvorak, David Saunders, Steven Salmons, Bob Ctvrtlik, Doug Partie, Steve Timmons, Craig Buck, Jeff Stork, Eric Sato, Patrick Powers, Karch Kiraly
Head coach
Marv Dunphy

== Awards ==
- Most Valuable Player

(France) Philippe Blain
