= 1979 Men's European Volleyball Championship =

Tournament details
- Host country: France
- Dates: October 5–12
- Teams: 12
- Venues: 3 (in 3 host cities)

Final positions
- Champions: Soviet Union (7th title)

The 1979 Men's European Volleyball Championship was the eleventh edition of the event, organized by Europe's governing volleyball body, the Confédération Européenne de Volleyball. It was hosted in several cities in France from October 5 to October 12, 1979, with the final round held in Paris.

== Teams ==
Group A – Nantes

- Greece
- Hungary
- Soviet Union
- Yugoslavia

Group B – Saint-Quentin

- Belgium
- Bulgaria
- Italy
- Poland

Group C – Toulouse

- Czechoslovakia
- East Germany
- France
- Romania

== Final ranking ==
Place	Team
1st place, gold medalist(s)	Soviet Union
2nd place, silver medalist(s)	Poland
3rd place, bronze medalist(s)	Yugoslavia
4.	France
5.	Italy
6.	Czechoslovakia
7.	Romania
8.	Hungary
9.	East Germany
10.	Bulgaria
11.	Belgium
12.	Greece

1979 Men's European champions

Soviet Union
Seventh title
