= 1981 Men's European Volleyball Championship =

Tournament details
- Host country: Bulgaria
- Dates: September 19–27
- Teams: 12
- Venues: 3 (in 3 host cities)

Final positions
- Champions: Soviet Union (8th title)

The 1981 Men's European Volleyball Championship was the twelfth edition of the event, organized by Europe's governing volleyball body, the Confédération Européenne de Volleyball. It was hosted in several cities in Bulgaria, with the final round held in Varna, from September 19 to September 27, 1981. It was won by the Soviet Union, their 8th title.

== Teams ==
Group A – Pazardzhik

- East Germany
- France
- Soviet Union
- West Germany

Group B – Burgas

- Czechoslovakia
- Italy
- Poland
- Spain

Group C – Varna

- Bulgaria
- Finland
- Romania
- Yugoslavia

== Final ranking ==
Place	Team
1st place, gold medalist(s)	Soviet Union
2nd place, silver medalist(s)	Poland
3rd place, bronze medalist(s)	Bulgaria
4.	Czechoslovakia
5.	Romania
6.	East Germany
7.	Italy
8.	France
9.	Finland
10.	Yugoslavia
11.	West Germany
12.	Spain

1981 Men's European champions

Soviet Union
Eighth title
