= 1985 Men's European Volleyball Championship =

Tournament details
- Host country: Netherlands
- Dates: September 29–October 4
- Teams: 12
- Venues: 3 (in 3 host cities)

Final positions
- Champions: Soviet Union (10th title)

The 1985 Men's European Volleyball Championship was the fourteenth edition of the event, organized by Europe's governing volleyball body, the Confédération Européenne de Volleyball. It was hosted in several cities in the Netherlands from September 29 to October 4, 1985.

== Teams ==
Group A – Voorburg

- Greece
- Italy
- Sweden
- Soviet Union

Group B – Zwolle

- Czechoslovakia
- Poland
- Romania
- Spain

Group C – Den Bosch

- Bulgaria
- France
- Netherlands
- Yugoslavia

== Final ranking ==
Place	Team
1st place, gold medalist(s)	Soviet Union
2nd place, silver medalist(s)	Czechoslovakia
3rd place, bronze medalist(s)	France
4.	Poland
5.	Bulgaria
6.	Italy
7.	Greece
8.	Romania
9.	Sweden
10.	Netherlands
11.	Yugoslavia
12.	Spain

1985 Men's European champions

Soviet Union
Tenth title
