= 1948 Men's European Volleyball Championship =

1948 Campionato Europeo di pallavolo (Italian)

Tournament details
- Host country: Italy
- City: (Italy) Rome
- Dates: 24–26 September
- Teams: 6 (from 1 confederation)
- Venue: Stadio Nicola Pietrangeli

Final positions
- Champions: Czechoslovakia (1st title)
- Runners-up: France
- Third place: Italy
- Fourth place: Portugal

Tournament statistics
- Matches played: 15

The 1948 Men's European Volleyball Championship was the inaugural edition of the Men's European Volleyball Championship. The first edition of this Championship was oganized by the European Volleyball governing body under the FIVB after they got established in 1947.

The tournament took place from the 24th to the 26th of September 1948 in Rome, Italy. Six countries participated in the tournament: Belgium, Czechoslovakia, France, Italy, The Netherlands, and Portugal.

The tournament was played as a Round Robin, with each team facing every other team once. A total of 15 matches were played, with the final standings determining the European champion. The championship was held at the Stadio Nicola Pietrangeli in Rome.

Czechoslovakia became the inaugural European Champions, finishing the tournament with a perfect 5-0 record and a 15-0 set record. France finished second with a 4-1 record, Italy finished third with a 3-2 record, and Portugal fourth with a 2-3 record, while Belgium and the Netherlands completed the standings with a 1-4 and 0-5 record, respectively.

== Teams ==
Team
Belgium
Czechoslovakia
France
Italy (H)
Netherlands
Portugal

== Overview of venue ==
The Stadio Nicola Pietrangeli, formerly known as the Stadio della Pallacorda, is an outdoor tennis stadium within the Foro Italico sports complex in Rome, Italy. The venue is officially an outdoor tennis stadium but has been subsequently adapted temporarily for the 1948 Men's European Volleyball Championship.

Tournament venue information

Venue	Games
(Italy) Stadio Nicola Pietrangeli	15

(Italy) Rome
Stadio Nicola Pietrangeli
Capacity: 3,720
Foro Italico-Campo Centrale - panoramio	1948 Men's European Volleyball Championship is located in Europe

== Round Robin ==
- Match won: 2 match point rewarded to the winner
- Match loss: 1 match point rewarded to the loser

=== Pool ===
Team	Pld	W	L	Pts	SW	SL	SR	SPW	SPL	SPR
Czechoslovakia	5	5	0	10	15	0	MAX	225	72	3.125
France	5	4	1	9	12	6	2.000	230	199	1.156
Italy	5	3	2	8	11	6	1.833	208	181	1.149
Portugal	5	2	3	7	7	9	0.778	179	172	1.041
Belgium	5	1	4	6	3	13	0.231	125	220	0.568
Netherlands	5	0	5	5	1	15	0.067	109	232	0.470

Source: CEV

=== Matches ===
Date	Time		Score		Set 1	Set 2	Set 3	Set 4	Set 5	Total	Report
24 Sep		Italy	3–0	Belgium	15–8	15–5	15–6			45–19	Report
24 Sep		Czechoslovakia	3–0	Netherlands	15–1	15–5	15–7			45–13	Report
24 Sep		France	3–1	Portugal	15–11	15–9	10–15	15–10		55–45	Report
24 Sep		Italy	3–0	Netherlands	15–4	15–5	15–13			45–22	Report
24 Sep		Czechoslovakia	3–0	Portugal	15–3	15–8	15–6			45–17	Report
25 Sep		France	3–0	Belgium	15–8	15–7	15–7			45–22	Report
25 Sep		Italy	3–0	Portugal	15–8	15–9	15–10			45–27	Report
25 Sep		Czechoslovakia	3–0	France	15–7	15–5	15–5			45–17	Report
25 Sep		Belgium	3–1	Netherlands	15–11	15–8	7–15	15–6		52–40	Report
26 Sep		Czechoslovakia	3–0	Belgium	15–4	15–5	15–5			45–14	Report
26 Sep		France	3–2	Italy	15–8	8–15	15–9	15–17	15–13	68–62	Report
26 Sep		Portugal	3–0	Netherlands	15–1	15–2	15–6			45–9	Report
26 Sep		Czechoslovakia	3–0	Italy	15–1	15–5	15–5			45–11	Report
26 Sep		France	3–0	Netherlands	15–11	15–10	15–4			45–25	Report
26 Sep		Portugal	3–0	Belgium	15–1	15–4	15–13			45–18	Report

== Final Standing ==
1948 Men's European champions

Czechoslovakia
First title

Pos	Team	Pld	W	L	Pts	SW	SL	SR	SPW	SPL	SPR
1	Czechoslovakia	5	5	0	10	15	0	MAX	225	72	3.125
2	France	5	4	1	9	12	6	2.000	230	199	1.156
3	Italy	5	3	2	8	11	6	1.833	208	181	1.149
4	Portugal	5	2	3	7	7	9	0.778	179	172	1.041
5	Belgium	5	1	4	6	3	13	0.231	125	220	0.568
6	Netherlands	5	0	5	5	1	15	0.067	109	232	0.470

Source: CEV
