= Michał Winiarski =

Polish volleyball player and coach

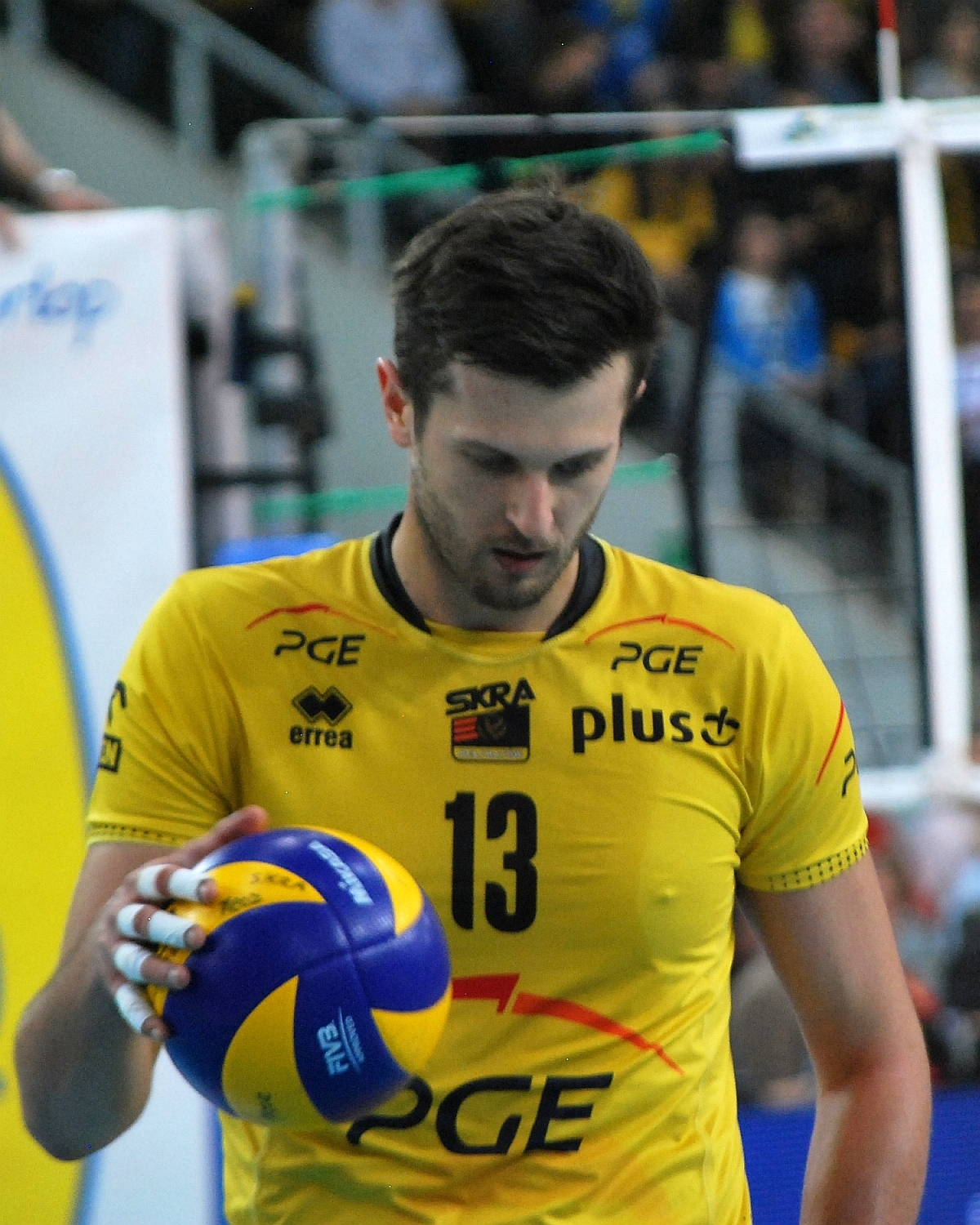
- Winiarski in 2014

Personal information
- Full name: Michał Jerzy Winiarski
- Nickname: Winiar
- Born: 28 September 1983 (age 43); Bydgoszcz, Poland
- Height: 2.00 m (6 ft 7 in)

Coaching information
- Current team: Warta Zawiercie
Previous teams coached
Years	Teams
2017–2019; 2019–2022; 2022–2025; 2022–	Skra Bełchatów (AC); Trefl Gdańsk; Germany; Warta Zawiercie

Volleyball information
- Position: Outside hitter

Career
Years	Teams
2002–2005; 2005–2006; 2006–2009; 2009–2013; 2013–2014; 2014–2017	AZS Częstochowa; Skra Bełchatów; Trentino Volley; Skra Bełchatów; Fakel Novy Urengoy; Skra Bełchatów

National team
2004–2014	Poland (240)
Honours
Men's volleyball
Representing Poland
FIVB World Championship
Gold medal – first place	2014 Poland
Silver medal – second place	2006 Japan
FIVB World Cup
Silver medal – second place	2011 Japan
FIVB World League
Gold medal – first place	2012 Sofia

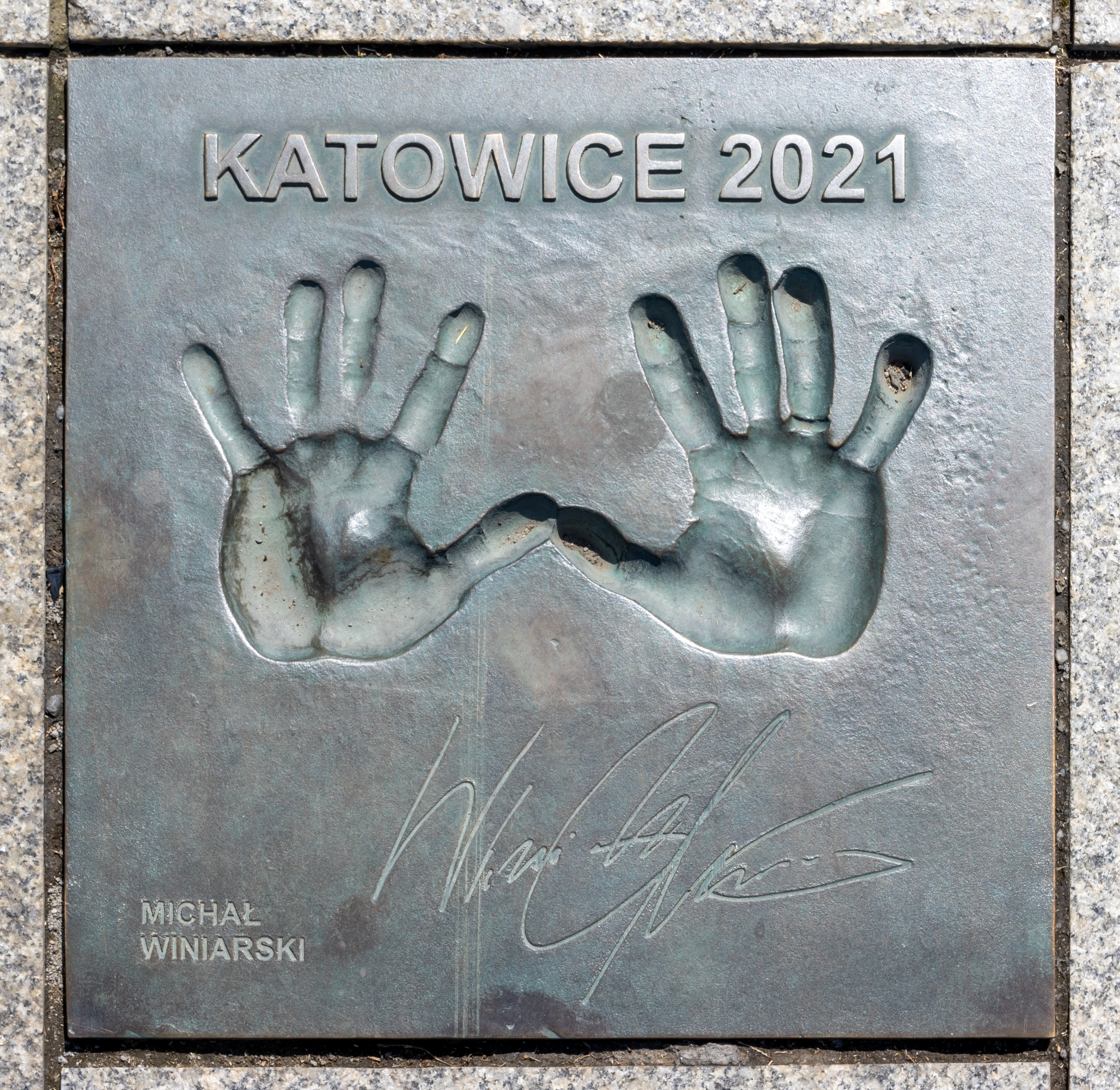
Hand prints and signature at the Avenue of Volleyball Stars, Katowice

Michał Jerzy Winiarski (born 28 September 1983) is a Polish professional volleyball coach and former player. Winiarski was a member of the Poland national team from 2004 to 2014, a participant in the Olympic Games (Beijing 2008, London 2012), 2014 World Champion, and the 2012 World League winner. He serves as head coach for the Polish PlusLiga team, Aluron CMC Warta Zawiercie.

== Personal life ==
Michał Winiarski was born in Bydgoszcz, Poland. He graduated from the Sports Championship School in Spała. He studied at the Management and Administration College in Opole. On 13 May 2006, he married Dagmara (née Stęplewska). On 28 November 2006, their son Oliwier was born. On 13 March 2014, his wife gave birth to their second son, named Antoni.

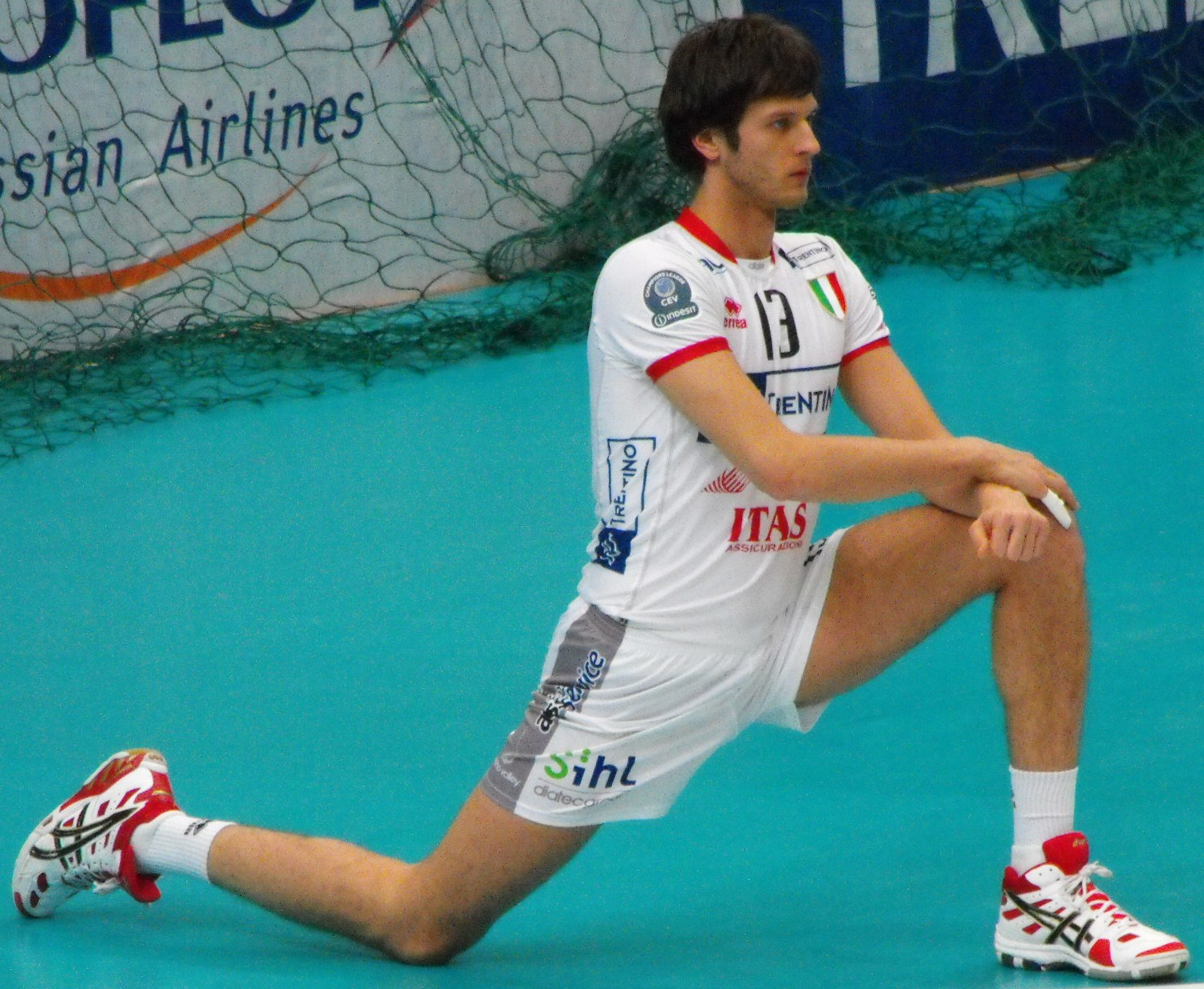
Winiarski as Itas Diatec Trentino player in 2009.

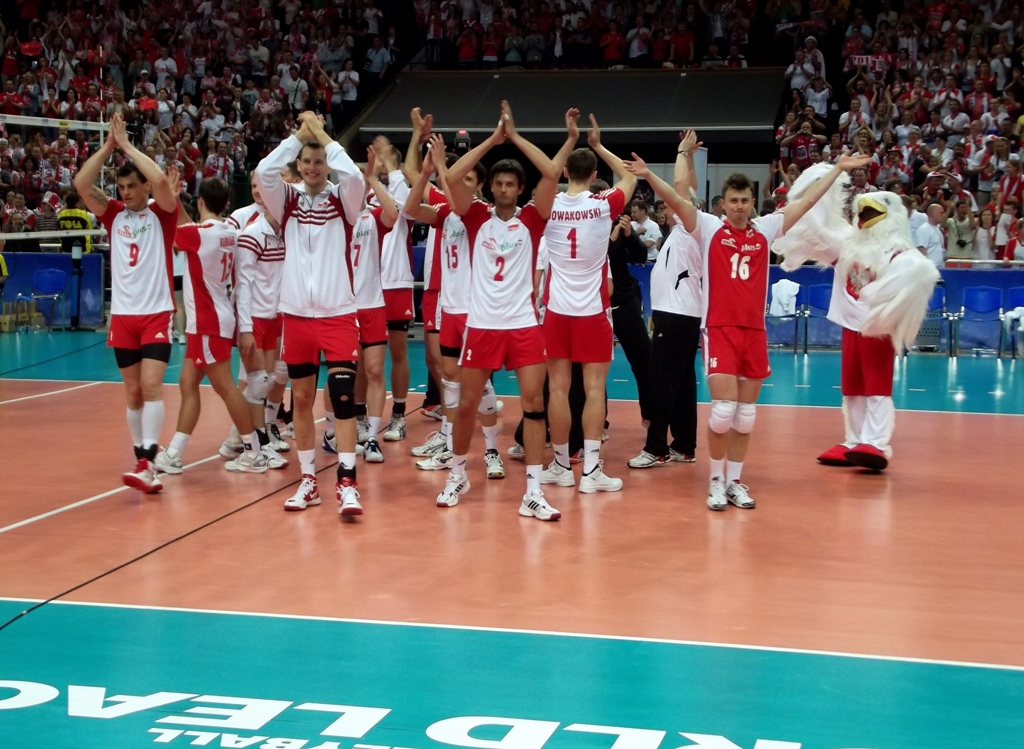
After winning the match at Spodek in Katowice (2012 World League). In the foreground from left: Zbigniew Bartman, Bartosz Kurek, Winiarski, and Krzysztof Ignaczak.

== Career as a player ==
=== Club ===
With AZS Częstochowa, Winiarski is a two–time bronze medallist of the Polish Championship (2004, 2005). He spent the 2005/2006 season as a player of BOT Skra Bełchatów, and won the Polish Championship and Polish Cup with this team. From 2006 to 2009, he played for Italian team Itas Diatec Trentino. With this team, he won the 2008–09 CEV Champions League, and was also named the Best Blocker of the tournament. He has a gold (2008) and silver (2009) medal from the Italian Championship. In 2009, he returned to PGE Skra Bełchatów. They won the Polish Championship in 2010, and 2011. He has a silver medal at the Club World Championship in 2010. In 2010, PGE Skra Bełchatów, including Winiarski, won a bronze medal of the CEV Champions League. They improved this result in 2012, when they won a silver medal of the CEV Champions League, after a match against Zenit Kazan at the Final Four held in Łódź, Poland. Michał Winiarski was named the Best Receiver of the tournament. In 2013, he signed a 2–year contract with Fakel Novy Urengoy, but eventually spent only one season in Russia. On 16 June 2014, it was officially announced that Winiarski is returning to Bełchatów, and had signed a two–year contract with PGE Skra Bełchatów. On 8 October 2014, his team won the Polish SuperCup. On 7 February 2016, he won the Polish Cup after beating ZAKSA in the final. After the 2016–17 PlusLiga season, Winiarski decided to end his volleyball career.

=== National team ===
In 2003, he captained the Polish national volleyball team to a gold medal at the U21 World Championship. He debuted as a senior national team player on 7 January 2004, in a match against Russia. In 2006, he took part in the World Championship, where the Polish team finished 2nd. During the course of the Poland–Brazil match for the gold medal, his first son was born. In 2008, he took part in the Olympic Games Beijing 2008, where Poland came in fifth, and Winiarski received an award for the Best Receiver of the tournament. In 2011, he and the rest of his national team, won a silver medal at the World Cup. On 8 July 2012, the Polish national team won a gold medal at the 2012 World League with the final tournament held in Sofia, Bulgaria. In May 2014, Winiarski was chosen as the new captain of the national team, replacing the previous one, Marcin Możdżonek. On 21 September 2014, Poland, with Winiarski as the captain, won a title of the world champions. On the same day, Winiarski announced his retirement from the national team.

On 27 October 2014, Winiarski received a state award granted by the Polish President, Bronisław Komorowski: the Officer's Cross of Polonia Restituta for outstanding sports achievements and worldwide promotion of Poland.

== Honours ==
=== As a player ===
- CEV Champions League
  - 2008–09 – with Itas Diatec Trentino
  - 2011–12 – with PGE Skra Bełchatów
- Domestic
  - 2005–06 Polish Cup, with BOT Skra Bełchatów
  - 2005–06 Polish Championship, with BOT Skra Bełchatów
  - 2007–08 Italian Championship, with Itas Diatec Trentino
  - 2009–10 Polish Championship, with PGE Skra Bełchatów
  - 2010–11 Polish Cup, with PGE Skra Bełchatów
  - 2010–11 Polish Championship, with PGE Skra Bełchatów
  - 2011–12 Polish Cup, with PGE Skra Bełchatów
  - 2014–15 Polish SuperCup, with PGE Skra Bełchatów
  - 2015–16 Polish Cup, with PGE Skra Bełchatów
- Youth national team
  - 2003 FIVB U21 World Championship

=== As a coach ===
- CEV Champions League
  - 2024–25 – with Aluron CMC Warta Zawiercie
  - 2025–26 – with Aluron CMC Warta Zawiercie
- Domestic
  - 2023–24 Polish Cup, with Aluron CMC Warta Zawiercie
  - 2024–25 Polish SuperCup, with Aluron CMC Warta Zawiercie
  - 2025–26 Polish Championship, with Aluron CMC Warta Zawiercie

=== Individual awards ===
- 2006: Polish Cup – Best server
- 2008: Olympic Games – Best receiver
- 2009: CEV Champions League – Best blocker
- 2011: Polish Cup – Best receiver
- 2012: CEV Champions League – Best receiver
- 2012: Polish Cup – Best receiver

=== State awards ===
- 2006: Gold Cross of Merit
- 2014: Officer's Cross of Polonia Restituta

Sporting positions
Preceded by (Italy) Andrea Giani	Head coach of Germany; 2022–2025	Succeeded by (Italy) Massimo Botti
