= Zbigniew Jasiukiewicz =

Polish volleyball player and coach

Personal information
- Born: 13 October 1947 Nowogród Bobrzański, Poland
- Died: 10 March 2005 (aged 57) Moers, Germany
- Height: 1.82 m (6 ft 0 in)

Coaching information
- Previous teams coached
- Years: Teams
- 1983–1987 1985–1989 1990–1992 1996–2000: West Germany; VBC Paderborn; SCC Berlin; Moerser SC

Volleyball information

Career
- Years: Team
- 1967–1970 1970–1976 1979–1981 1981–1983: AZS AWF Warsaw; Resovia; SC Fortuna Bonn; VBC Paderborn

National team
- Years: Team
- 1967–1976: Poland (162)
Honours
Men's volleyball
Representing Poland
CEV European Championship
Silver medal – second place	1975 Yugoslavia
Bronze medal – third place	1967 Turkey

Zbigniew Jasiukiewicz (13 October 1947 – 10 March 2005) was a Polish volleyball player and coach, a member of the Poland national team from 1967 to 1976. He competed in the men's tournament at the 1968 Summer Olympics.

== Honours ==
=== As a player ===
- CEV European Champions Cup
  - (silver) 1972–73 – with Resovia
- Domestic
  - 1967–68 (gold) Polish Championship, with AZS AWF Warsaw
  - 1970–71 (gold) Polish Championship, with Resovia
  - 1971–72 (gold) Polish Championship, with Resovia
  - 1973–74 (gold) Polish Championship, with Resovia
  - 1974–75 Polish Cup, with Resovia
  - 1974–75 (gold) Polish Championship, with Resovia

Sporting positions
Preceded by (Germany) Michael Gregori	Head coach of West Germany; 1983–1987	Succeeded by (Romania) Stelian Moculescu
