= Germany men's national volleyball team =

Germany
- Nickname(s): Die Adler (The Eagles); Die Mannschaft (The Team)
- Association: Deutscher Volleyball-Verband (DVV)
- Confederation: CEV
- Head coach: Massimo Botti
- FIVB ranking: 12 (3 August 2026)

Uniforms
Home	Away	Third

Summer Olympics
- Appearances: 5 (Note: by Germany national team, East Germany national team and West Germany national team) (First in 1968)
- Best result: 5th (2012)

World Championship
- Appearances: 13 (First in 1956)
- Best result: (2014)

European Championship
- Appearances: 26 (First in 1958)
- Best result: (2017)
- www.volleyball-verband.de (in German)
Honours
Medal record
World Championship
Bronze medal – third place	2014 Poland	Team
European Games
Gold medal – first place	2015 Baku	Team
European Championship
Silver medal – second place	2017 Poland	Team
Universiade
Gold medal – first place	1999 Palma de Mallorca

The Germany men's national volleyball team represents Germany in international volleyball competitions. It is governed by the German Volleyball Association. Germany won the gold medal at the 1970 World Championship as East Germany and the bronze medal at the 2014 World Championship.

After German reunification, West Germany (1949–1990) was renamed Germany and they absorbed East Germany (1949–1990) with the records. Since 1992 they have appeared at the Olympic Games on two occasions, finishing with a ninth place at Beijing 2008 and a fifth place at London 2012. However, Germany have enjoyed some recent success on the continental stage, winning gold at the 2015 European Games and silver at the 2017 European Championship. Before reunification, East Germany finished fourth at Mexico City 1968, before winning the silver medal at Munich 1972. East Germany were also crowned FIVB Men's Volleyball World Championship and clinched the FIVB World Cup in 1969.

== Competition record ==
By West Germany national team, East Germany national team and Germany national team

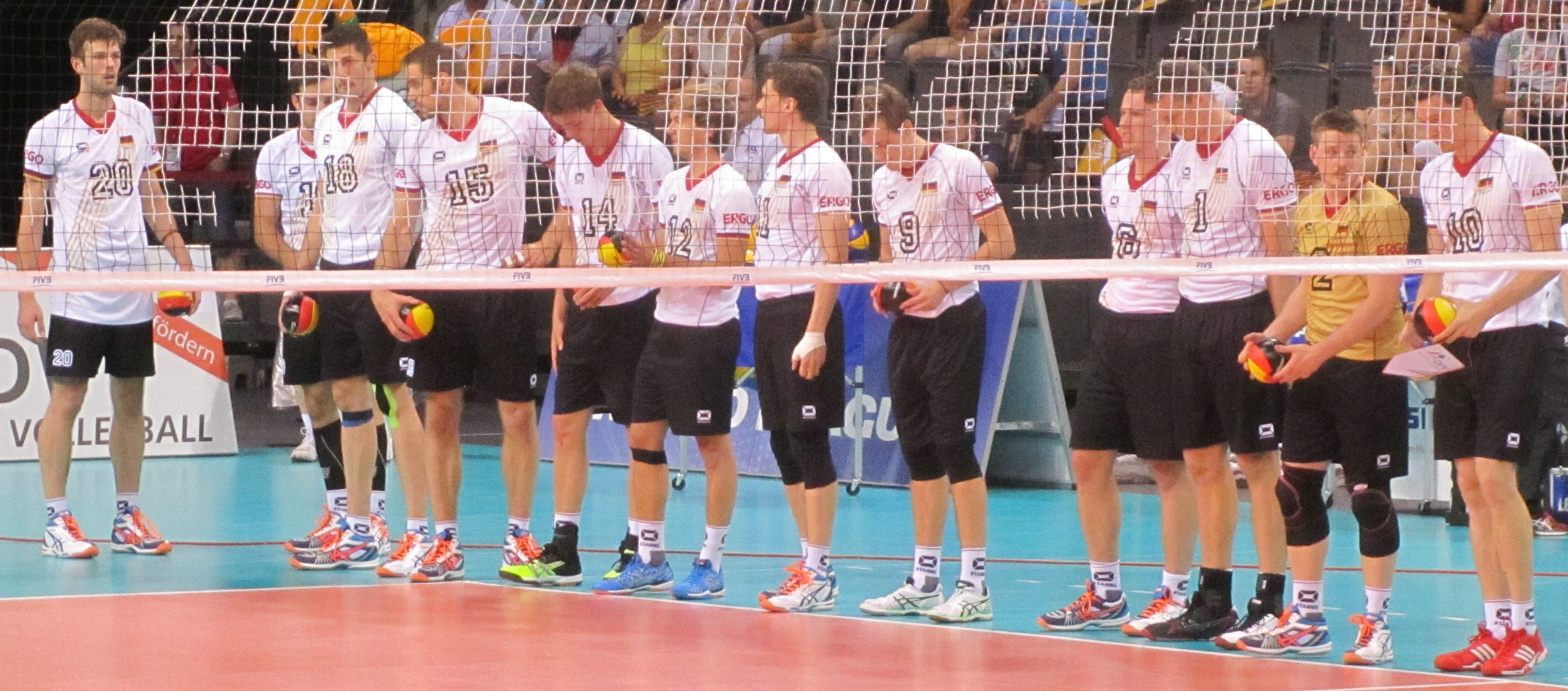
Germany team in World Championship 2014

=== Olympics Games ===
Champions Runners up Third place Fourth place

Olympic Games record
Year	Result	Pld	W	L	SW	SL	PW	PL
(Japan) 1964	did not qualify							
(Mexico) 1968	4th	9	6	3	22	12	449	374
(West Germany) 1972	East Germany	7	5	2	16	8	295	256
(Canada) 1976	did not qualify							
(Soviet Union) 1980	did not qualify							
(United States) 1984	did not qualify							
(South Korea) 1988	did not qualify							
(Spain) 1992	did not qualify							
(United States) 1996	did not qualify							
(Australia) 2000	did not qualify							
(Greece) 2004	did not qualify							
(China) 2008	9th	5	1	4	6	12	418	440
(United Kingdom) 2012	5th	6	2	4	6	14	429	463
(Brazil) 2016	did not qualify							
(Japan) 2020	did not qualify							
(France) 2024	6th	4	2	2	10	8	397	372
(United States) 2028	Future event							
(Australia) 2032	Future event							
Total	5/18	31	16	15	60	54	1988	1905

=== World Championship ===
Champions Runners up Third place Fourth place

Year	Result	Pld	W	L	SW	SL	PW	PL
(Czechoslovakia) 1949	did not enter							
(Soviet Union) 1952	did not enter							
(France) 1956	12th	10	8	2	24	10	480	387
(Brazil) 1960	did not qualify							
(Soviet Union) 1962	11th	10	8	2	25	9	480	329
(Czechoslovakia) 1966	4th	12	8	4	26	15	505	407
(Bulgaria) 1970	did not qualify							
(Mexico) 1974	4th	11	6	5	21	19	478	446
(Italy) 1978	9th	10	4	6	15	20	361	437
(Argentina) 1982	12th	10	2	8	10	24	363	439
(France) 1986	did not qualify							
(Brazil) 1990	did not qualify							
(Greece) 1994	11th	4	1	3	4	10	128	193
(Japan) 1998	did not qualify							
(Argentina) 2002	did not qualify							
(Japan) 2006	9th	14	8	6	28	24	1196	1183
(Italy) 2010	8th	9	3	6	12	18	659	689
(Poland) 2014	3rd	16	11	5	34	19	1243	1136
(Italy) (Bulgaria) 2018	did not qualify							
(Poland) (Slovenia) 2022	15th	4	1	3	4	9	291	311
(Philippines) 2025	21st	3	1	2	4	6	252	249
(Poland) 2027	To be determined							
(Qatar) 2029	To be determined							
Total	1 Title	113	61	52	207	183	6436	6206

=== World Cup ===
Champions Runners up Third place Fourth place

Year	Result	Pld	W	L	SW	SL	PW	PL
(Poland) 1965	5th place	7	3	4	13	13	305	301
(East Germany) 1969	East Germany	7	6	1	19	6	341	237
(Japan) 1977	did not qualify							
(Japan) 1981	did not qualify							
(Japan) 1985	did not qualify							
(Japan) 1989	did not qualify							
(Japan) 1991	7th	8	5	3	19	9	N/A	N/A
(Japan) 1995	did not qualify							
(Japan) 1999	did not qualify							
(Japan) 2003	did not qualify							
(Japan) 2007	did not qualify							
(Japan) 2011	did not qualify							
(Japan) 2015	did not qualify							
(Japan) 2019	did not qualify							
(Japan) 2023	did not qualify							
Total	1 Title	22	14	8	51	28	646	538

=== World League ===
Champions Runners up Third place Fourth place

World League record
Year	Round	Position	GP	MW	ML	SW	SL	Squad
(Japan) 1990	did not participate							
(Italy) 1991	did not participate							
(Italy) 1992	Intercontinental round	12th	12	1	11	9	35	Squad
(Brazil) 1993	Intercontinental round	8th	20	9	11	32	42	Squad
(Italy) 1994	Intercontinental round	10th	12	2	10	9	33	Squad
(Brazil) 1995	did not participate							
(Netherlands) 1996	did not participate							
(Russia) 1997	did not participate							
(Italy) 1998	did not participate							
(Argentina) 1999	did not participate							
(Netherlands) 2000	did not participate							
(Poland) 2001	Intercontinental round	13th	12	0	12	11	36	Squad
(Brazil) 2002	Intercontinental round	9th	12	4	8	21	30	Squad
(Spain) 2003	Intercontinental round	10th	12	4	8	20	29	Squad
(Italy) 2004	did not qualify							
(Serbia and Montenegro) 2005	did not qualify							
(Russia) 2006	did not qualify							
(Poland) 2007	did not qualify							
(Brazil) 2008	did not qualify							
(Serbia) 2009	did not qualify							
(Argentina) 2010	Intercontinental round	9th	12	7	5	26	21	Squad
(Poland) 2011	Intercontinental round	11th	12	5	7	23	28	Squad
(Poland) 2012	Final round	5th	14	11	3	37	15	Squad
(Argentina) 2013	Intercontinental round	7th	10	5	5	21	19	Squad
(Italy) 2014	Intercontinental round	16th	12	5	7	18	26	Squad
(Brazil) 2015	withdrew							
(Poland) 2016	Group Final round	26th	8	3	5	15	16	Squad
(Brazil) 2017	Group Final round	27th	8	6	2	19	8	Squad
Total	5th place	13/28	156	62	94	261	338	—

=== Nations League ===
Champions Runners up Third place Fourth place

Nations League record
Year	Result	GP	MW	ML	SW	SL	PW	PL	Squad
(France) 2018	9th	15	7	8	29	30	1299	1307	Squad
(United States) 2019	14th	15	3	12	23	41	1349	1470	Squad
(Italy) 2021	13th	15	4	11	22	38	1255	1360	Squad
(Italy) 2022	12th	12	4	8	18	29	969	1103	Squad
(Poland) 2023	11th	12	3	9	16	28	963	1036	Squad
(Poland) 2024	11th	12	5	7	20	25	1018	1048	Squad
(China) 2025	15th	12	5	7	25	27	1181	1179	Squad
(China) 2026	13th	12	5	7	23	28	1133	1162	Squad
(N/A) 2027	qualified								
Total	9/9	105	36	69	176	246	9167	9665	—

=== European Games ===
Champions Runners up Third place Fourth place

Year	Result	Pld	W	L	SW	SL	PW	PL
(Azerbaijan) 2015	1st	8	7	1	22	5	665	559
(Belarus) 2019	Volleyball tournament not held							
(Poland) 2023	Volleyball tournament not held							
Total	1 Title	8	7	1	22	5	665	559

=== European Championship ===
Champions Runners up Third place Fourth place

European Championship record
Year	Round	Position	GP	MW	ML	SW	SL	Squad
(Italy) 1948	did not enter							
(Bulgaria) 1950	did not enter							
(France) 1951	did not enter							
(Romania) 1955	did not enter							
(Czechoslovakia) 1958	1st round	9th	11	9	2	27	10	Squad
(Romania) 1963	1st round	9th	10	9	1	28	5	Squad
(Turkey) 1967	Final group	4th	10	7	3	25	12	Squad
(Italy) 1971	Final group	4th	8	5	3	15	11	Squad
(Socialist Federal Republic of Yugoslavia) 1975	1st round	7th	7	5	2	16	7	Squad
(Finland) 1977	1st round	9th	7	4	3	13	13	Squad
(France) 1979	1st round	9th	7	2	5	9	15	Squad
(Bulgaria) 1981	Final group	6th	7	2	5	11	17	Squad
(East Germany) 1983	Final group	6th	7	3	4	10	15	Squad
(Netherlands) 1985	did not qualify							
(Belgium) 1987	did not qualify							
(Sweden) 1989	1st round	9th	7	2	5	11	19	Squad
(Germany) 1991	Semifinals	4th	7	3	4	12	14	Squad
(Finland) 1993	Semifinals	4th	7	4	3	13	15	Squad
(Greece) 1995	2nd round	8th	7	2	5	9	16	Squad
(Netherlands) 1997	Groups round	9th	5	2	3	7	12	Squad
(Austria) 1999	did not qualify							
(Czech Republic) 2001	Groups round	9th	5	1	4	6	14	Squad
(Germany) 2003	2nd round	7th	7	4	3	14	12	Squad
(Italy) 2005	did not qualify							
(Russia) 2007	2nd round	5th	8	5	3	16	11	Squad
(Turkey) 2009	2nd round	5th	8	4	4	16	17	Squad
(Austria) (Czech Republic) 2011	1st round	15th	3	0	3	3	9	Squad
(Denmark) (Poland) 2013	Quarterfinals	6th	4	3	1	10	5	Squad
(Bulgaria) (Italy) 2015	Quarterfinals	8th	5	2	3	8	9	Squad
(Poland) 2017	Final	2nd	6	5	1	16	8	Squad
(Belgium) (France) (Netherlands) (Slovenia) 2019	Quarterfinals	8th	7	3	4	12	13	Squad
(Czech Republic) (Estonia) (Finland) (Poland) 2021	Quarterfinals	5th	7	5	2	16	10	Squad
(Italy) (Bulgaria) (North Macedonia) (Israel) 2023	Round of 16	9th	6	3	3	14	11	Squad
(Bulgaria) (Finland) (Italy) (Romania) 2026	Quarterfinals	7th	7	5	2	15	12	Squad
(Montenegro) 2028	To be determined							
Total	Final	26/34	180	110	89	354	311	—

=== European League ===
Champions Runners up Third place Fourth place

Year	Result	Pld	W	L	SW	SL	PW	PL
(Czech Republic) 2004	4th	14	8	6	30	22	1218	1149
(Russia) 2005	5th	12	5	7	21	23	1025	1001
(Turkey) 2006	5th	12	6	6	26	22	1082	1041
(Portugal) 2007	6th	12	8	4	28	21	1091	1048
(Turkey) 2008	4th	14	8	6	31	24	1261	1194
(Portugal) 2009	1st	14	10	4	37	19	1270	1173
Total	1 Title	78	45	33	173	131	6947	6606

=== FIVB Olympic Qualification Tournament ===
Champions Runners up Third place Fourth place

Year	Result	Pld	W	L	SW	SL	PW	PL
(Bulgaria) 2019	Did not Enter							
(Brazil) 2023	Champions	7	7	0	21	4	611	493
Total	1 Title	7	7	0	21	4	611	493

=== FIVB Olympic Qualification Tournament - Men's European qualification ===
Champions Runners up Third place Fourth place Q Qualified to Olympic games

Year	Result	Pld	W	L	SW	SL	PW	PL	QO
(Poland) 2000	Pre–qualification Round	8	4	4	18	17	779	760	X
(Germany) 2004	3rd place	4	2	2	5	9	309	324	X
(Turkey) 2008	5th place	7	5	2	17	12	639	611	Q
(Bulgaria) 2012	2nd place	6	6	3	20	21	813	729	Q
(Germany) 2016	4th place	5	3	2	12	5	471	444	X
(Germany) 2019	2nd place	5	3	2	11	6	421	408	X
Total	6 Title	35	23	15	83	70	3,432	3,276	2

== Team ==
=== Current squad ===
Roster for the 2024 Summer Olympics. The roster was announced on 28 June 2024.

Head coach: (Poland) Michał Winiarski

- 1 Christian Fromm OH
- 5 Moritz Reichert OH
- 6 Johannes Tille S
- 9 György Grozer OP
- 10 Julian Zenger L
- 11 Lukas Kampa (c) S
- 12 Anton Brehme MB
- 13 Ruben Schott OH
- 14 Moritz Karlitzek OH
- 21 Tobias Krick MB
- 22 Tobias Brand OH
- 25 Lukas Maase MB

=== Coaches history ===
Years	Name
1956–1956	(Germany) Eberhard Schulz
1957–1958	(Germany) Werner Lohr
1958–1970	(Germany) Edgar Blossfeldt
1959–1960	(Poland) Jerzy Pławczyk
1961–1964	(Germany) Alexander Mühle
1965–1971	(Czech Republic) Miroslav Rovný
1971–1971	(Czech Republic) Josef Stolarik
1971–1971	(Japan) Akira Kato
1971–1972	(Germany) Manfred Kindermann
1973–1974	(Germany) Michael Gregori
1974–1975	(Romania) Sebastian Mihăilescu
1976–1983	(Germany) Michael Gregori
1983–1987	(Poland) Zbigniew Jasiukiewicz
1987–1990	(Romania) Stelian Moculescu
1990–1994	(Slovakia) Igor Prieložný
1995–1998	(Germany) Olaf Kortmann
1999–2008	(Romania) Stelian Moculescu
2009–2011	(Argentina) Raúl Lozano
2012–2016	(Belgium) Vital Heynen
2017–2021	(Italy) Andrea Giani
2022–2025	(Poland) Michał Winiarski
2026–present	(Italy) Massimo Botti

== Kit providers ==
The table below shows the history of kit providers for the Germany national volleyball team.

Period	Kit provider
2003–2021	(Japan) Asics (Italy) Erreà (Netherlands) Stanno
2021–2023	(Denmark) Hummel
2023–2025	(Germany) Kempa (Japan) Mikasa
2026–	(Germany) Adidas

=== Sponsorship ===
Primary sponsors include: main sponsors like Kempa Sport other sponsors: Mikasa, volleyballdirekt and Kintex.
