= 1969 FIVB Volleyball Men's World Cup =

1969 Men's World Cup
Tournament details
- Host country: East Germany
- Dates: 13–20 September
- Teams: 12
- Venues: 4 (in 4 host cities)

Final positions
- Champions: East Germany (1st title)
- Runners-up: Japan
- Third place: Soviet Union
- Fourth place: Bulgaria

The 1969 FIVB Men's World Cup was held from 13 to 20 September 1969 in East Germany.

== Qualification ==
Means of qualification	Date	Host	Vacancies	Qualified
Host country	—	―	1	East Germany
1965 FIVB Volleyball Men's World Cup	13–19 September 1965	Poland	1	Soviet Union
1966 FIVB Volleyball Men's World Championship	30 Aug – 11 Sep 1966	Czechoslovakia	1	Czechoslovakia
Volleyball at the 1968 Summer Olympics	13–26 October 1968	Mexico City	1	Japan
1972 Summer Olympics Host	―	―	1	West Germany
1967 Men's European Volleyball Championship	26 Oct – 8 Nov 1967	Turkey	2	Poland
1967 Men's European Volleyball Championship	26 Oct – 8 Nov 1967	Turkey	2	Romania
1969 Men's South American Volleyball Championship	15–24 August 1969	(Venezuela) Caracas	1	Brazil
1969 Men's NORCECA Volleyball Championship	2–7 August 1969	Mexico City	1	Cuba
Asian Team	―	―	1	~~North Korea~~; Bulgaria*
1967 Men's African Volleyball Championship	July 1967	(Tunisia) Tunis	1	Tunisia
Total			11	

* North Korea were replaced by Bulgaria.

== Results ==
=== First round ===
==== Pool A ====
Location: East Berlin

Pos	Team	Pld	W	L	Pts	SW	SL	SR	SPW	SPL	SPR	Qualification
1	East Germany	3	3	0	6	9	2	4.500	159	94	1.691	Final places
2	Czechoslovakia	3	2	1	5	8	5	1.600	167	148	1.128	Final places
3	Romania	3	1	2	4	5	6	0.833	145	127	1.142	7th–11th places
4	Tunisia	3	0	3	3	0	9	0.000	33	135	0.244	7th–11th places

Date	Time		Score		Set 1	Set 2	Set 3	Set 4	Set 5	Total	Report
13 Sep		Czechoslovakia	3–0	Tunisia	15–4	15–3	15–1			45–8	
13 Sep		East Germany	3–0	Romania	15–8	15–13	15–8			45–29	
14 Sep		Romania	3–0	Tunisia	15–2	15–8	15–9			45–19	
14 Sep		East Germany	3–2	Czechoslovakia	15–13	15–7	10–15	14–16	15–8	69–59	
15 Sep		Czechoslovakia	3–2	Romania	8–15	15–13	6–15	19–17	15–11	63–71	
15 Sep		East Germany	3–0	Tunisia	15–5	15–1	15–0			45–6	

==== Pool B ====
Location: Leipzig

Pos	Team	Pld	W	L	Pts	SW	SL	SR	SPW	SPL	SPR	Qualification
1	Brazil	3	3	0	6	9	4	2.250	180	144	1.250	Final places
2	Japan	3	2	1	5	7	3	2.333	136	121	1.124	Final places
3	Poland	3	1	2	4	5	6	0.833	141	146	0.966	7th–11th places
4	Cuba	3	0	3	3	1	9	0.111	105	151	0.695	7th–11th places

Date	Time		Score		Set 1	Set 2	Set 3	Set 4	Set 5	Total	Report
13 Sep		Brazil	3–2	Poland	15–8	12–15	19–17	5–15	15–7	66–62	
13 Sep		Japan	3–0	Cuba	17–15	15–4	15–13			47–32	
14 Sep		Brazil	3–1	Cuba	15–12	13–15	15–4	15–8		58–39	
14 Sep		Japan	3–0	Poland	16–14	15–10	15–9			46–33	
15 Sep		Poland	3–0	Cuba	15–13	16–14	15–7			46–34	
15 Sep		Brazil	3–1	Japan	15–10	15–10	11–15	15–8		56–43	

==== Pool C ====
Location: Halle

Pos	Team	Pld	W	L	Pts	SW	SL	SR	SPW	SPL	SPR	Qualification
1	Soviet Union	2	2	0	4	6	2	3.000	110	61	1.803	Final places
2	Bulgaria	2	1	1	3	5	3	1.667	97	78	1.244	Final places
3	West Germany	2	0	2	2	0	6	0.000	22	90	0.244	7th–11th places

Date	Time		Score		Set 1	Set 2	Set 3	Set 4	Set 5	Total	Report
13 Sep		Soviet Union	3–2	Bulgaria	10–15	15–8	15–10	10–15	15–4	65–52	
14 Sep		Bulgaria	3–0	West Germany	15–3	15–1	15–9			45–13	
15 Sep		Soviet Union	3–0	West Germany	15–4	15–4	15–1			45–9	

=== Final round ===
The results and the points of the matches between the same teams that were already played during the first round are taken into account for the final round.

==== 7th–11th places ====
Location: Halle and Schwerin

Pos	Team	Pld	W	L	Pts	SW	SL	SR	SPW	SPL	SPR
7	Romania	4	4	0	8	12	0	MAX	180	98	1.837
8	Poland	4	3	1	7	9	3	3.000	166	118	1.407
9	Cuba	4	2	2	6	6	7	0.857	154	148	1.041
10	West Germany	4	1	3	5	4	9	0.444	124	173	0.717
11	Tunisia	4	0	4	4	0	12	0.000	94	181	0.519

Date	Time		Score		Set 1	Set 2	Set 3	Set 4	Set 5	Total	Report
17 Sep		Poland	3–0	Tunisia	15–12	15–8	15–2			45–22	
17 Sep		Romania	3–0	West Germany	15–5	15–13	15–10			45–28	
18 Sep		Poland	3–0	West Germany	15–8	15–5	15–4			45–17	
18 Sep		Cuba	3–0	Tunisia	15–5	15–9	15–10			45–24	
19 Sep		Romania	3–0	Cuba	15–7	15–6	15–8			45–21	
19 Sep		West Germany	3–0	Tunisia	15–3	16–14	15–12			46–29	
20 Sep		Cuba	3–1	West Germany	15–10	15–2	9–15	15–6		54–33	
20 Sep		Romania	3–0	Poland	15–10	15–7	15–13			45–30	

==== Final places ====
Location: Halle and Schwerin

Pos	Team	Pld	W	L	Pts	SW	SL	SR	SPW	SPL	SPR
1	East Germany	5	4	1	9	13	6	2.167	251	202	1.243
2	Japan	5	4	1	9	13	6	2.167	240	213	1.127
3	Soviet Union	5	3	2	8	10	9	1.111	234	220	1.064
4	Bulgaria	5	2	3	7	9	9	1.000	223	216	1.032
5	Czechoslovakia	5	1	4	6	7	13	0.538	233	269	0.866
6	Brazil	5	1	4	6	4	13	0.308	172	233	0.738

Date	Time		Score		Set 1	Set 2	Set 3	Set 4	Set 5	Total	Report
17 Sep		Bulgaria	3–0	Brazil	15–7	15–10	15–8			45–25	
17 Sep		Japan	3–1	Czechoslovakia	15–13	15–4	6–15	15–12		51–44	
17 Sep		East Germany	3–1	Soviet Union	15–5	6–15	15–11	15–11		51–42	
18 Sep		Japan	3–1	Bulgaria	15–13	5–15	15–10	15–13		50–51	
18 Sep		Soviet Union	3–1	Czechoslovakia	15–10	15–11	13–15	15–11		58–47	
18 Sep		East Germany	3–0	Brazil	15–5	15–8	15–7			45–20	
19 Sep		Czechoslovakia	3–1	Brazil	15–12	10–15	15–12	15–7		55–46	
19 Sep		Japan	3–0	Soviet Union	15–7	15–12	15–5			45–24	
19 Sep		East Germany	3–0	Bulgaria	15–6	15–8	18–16			48–30	
20 Sep		Bulgaria	3–0	Czechoslovakia	15–13	15–9	15–6			45–28	
20 Sep		Soviet Union	3–0	Brazil	15–8	15–6	15–11			45–25	
20 Sep		Japan	3–1	East Germany	15–4	15–13	6–15	15–6		51–38	

== Final standing ==
Rank	Team
1st place, gold medalist(s)	East Germany
2nd place, silver medalist(s)	Japan
3rd place, bronze medalist(s)	Soviet Union
4	Bulgaria
5	Czechoslovakia
6	Brazil
7	Romania
8	Poland
9	Cuba
10	West Germany
11	Tunisia
12	East Germany (Junior)^{1}

1969 Men's World Cup champions

East Germany
1st title

^{1} East Germany Junior men's national team played friendly games in the place of North Korea.
