= 2014 FIVB Men's Volleyball World Championship =

Volleyball world championship

2014 FIVB Men's World Championship
Mistrzostwa Świata w Piłce Siatkowej Mężczyzn 2014

Tournament details
- Host country: Poland
- Dates: 30 August – 21 September
- Teams: 24 (from 5 confederations)
- Venue: 7 (in 7 host cities)
- Officially opened by: President of Poland Bronisław Komorowski

Final positions
- Champions: Poland (2nd title)
- Runners-up: Brazil
- Third place: Germany
- Fourth place: France

Tournament awards
- MVP: (Poland) Mariusz Wlazły
- Best Setter: (Germany) Lukas Kampa
- Best OH: (Brazil) Ricardo Lucarelli (Brazil) Murilo Endres
- Best MB: (Germany) Marcus Böhme (Poland) Karol Kłos
- Best OPP: (Poland) Mariusz Wlazły
- Best Libero: (France) Jenia Grebennikov

Tournament statistics
- Matches played: 103
- Attendance: 563,263 (5,469 per match)

The 2014 FIVB Men's Volleyball World Championship was held in Poland from 30 August to 21 September 2014. The tournament featured 24 teams to determine the world champions in men's volleyball. In addition to the host nation Poland, 23 teams qualified for the tournament through continental and regional competitions. The matches took place in seven venues across seven Polish cities, with the final being played at Spodek, Katowice.

The tournament was won by the hosts Poland, who beat Brazil (who had won the previous three titles) in the final. Poland became the third team in the history of the competition to be crowned as champions in their own country, joining the Soviet Union (1952 and 1962) and Czechoslovakia (1966).

563,263 fans (Note: FIVB announced that the final attendance for this tournament was 563,263. But, in fact, the total number of spectators based on match reports was 586,887, not 563,263.) watched the matches during the 18-day event, smashing the previous records in the competition. In Italy four years earlier, the total was 339,324, while in Japan in 2006, it was 298,352.

== Host ==
The tournament was held in seven Polish cities.

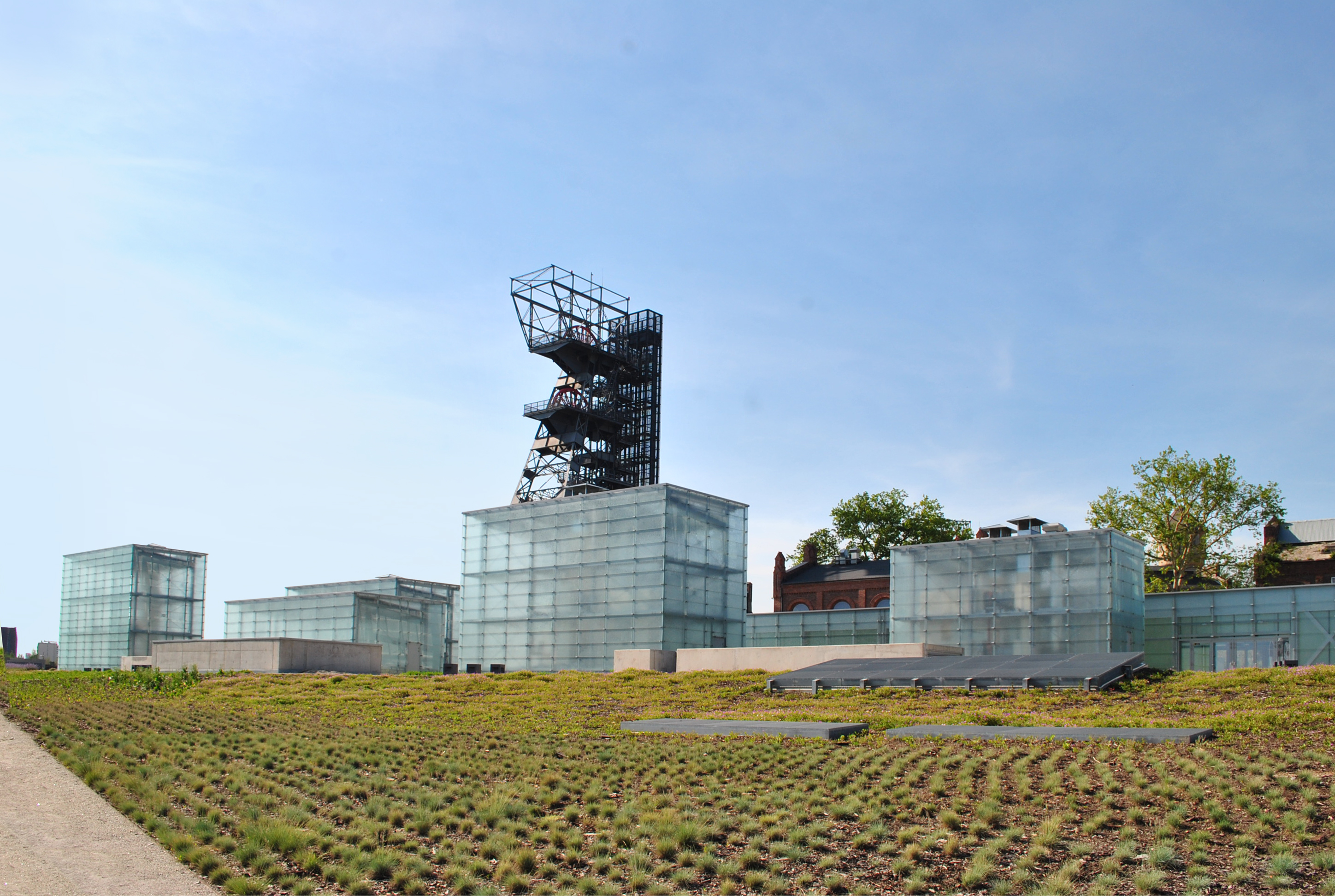
Katowice

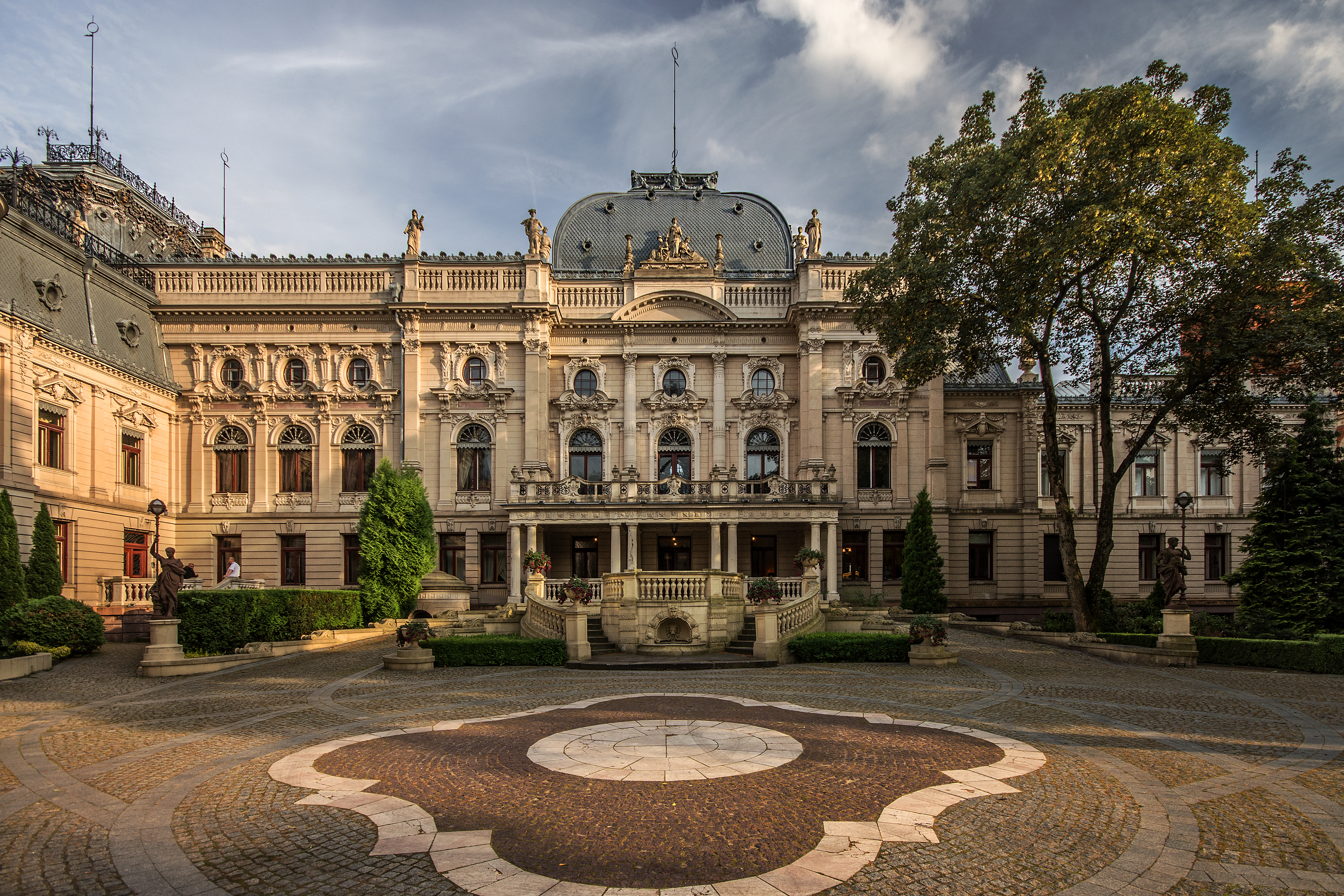
Łódź

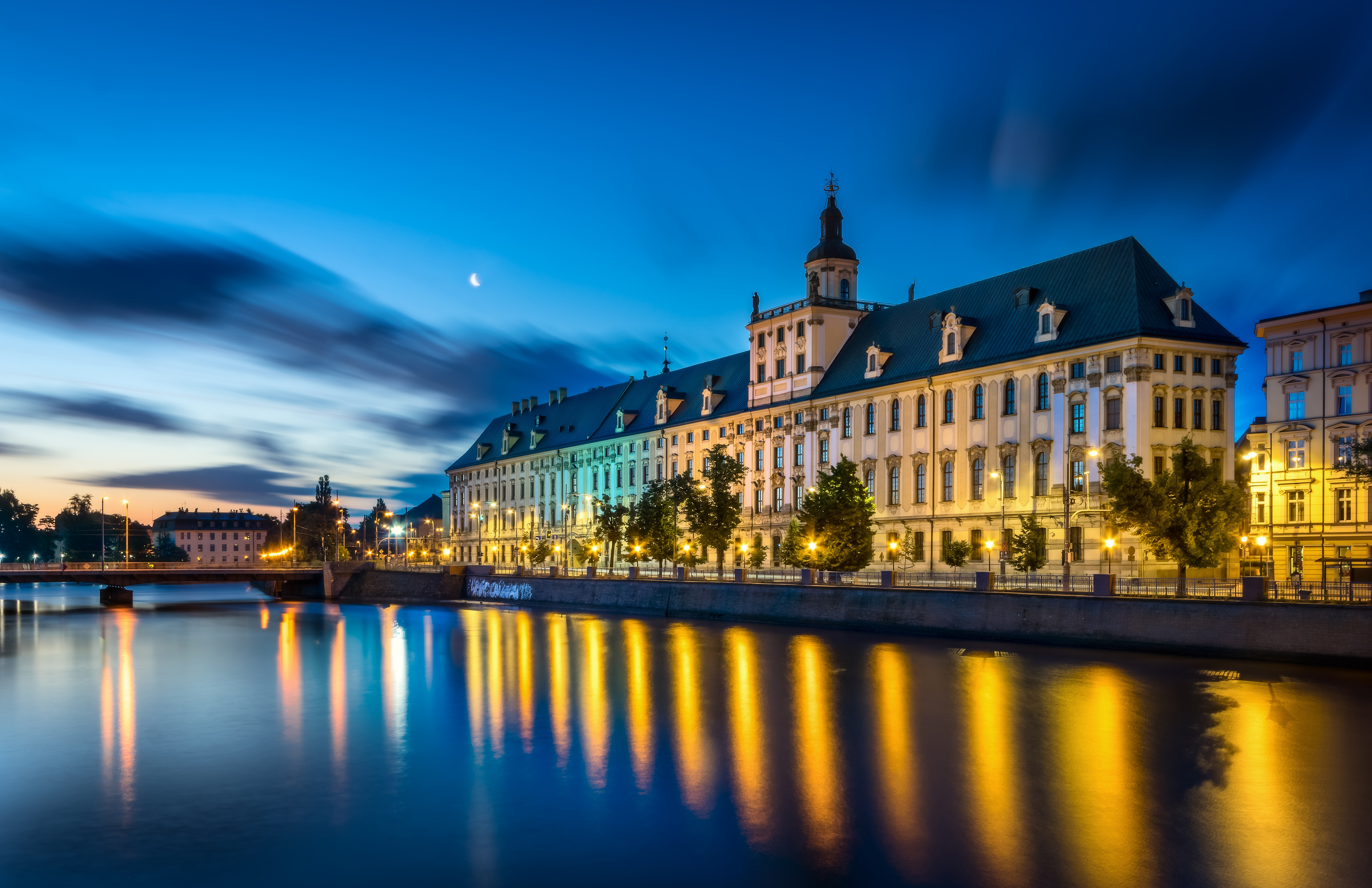
Wrocław

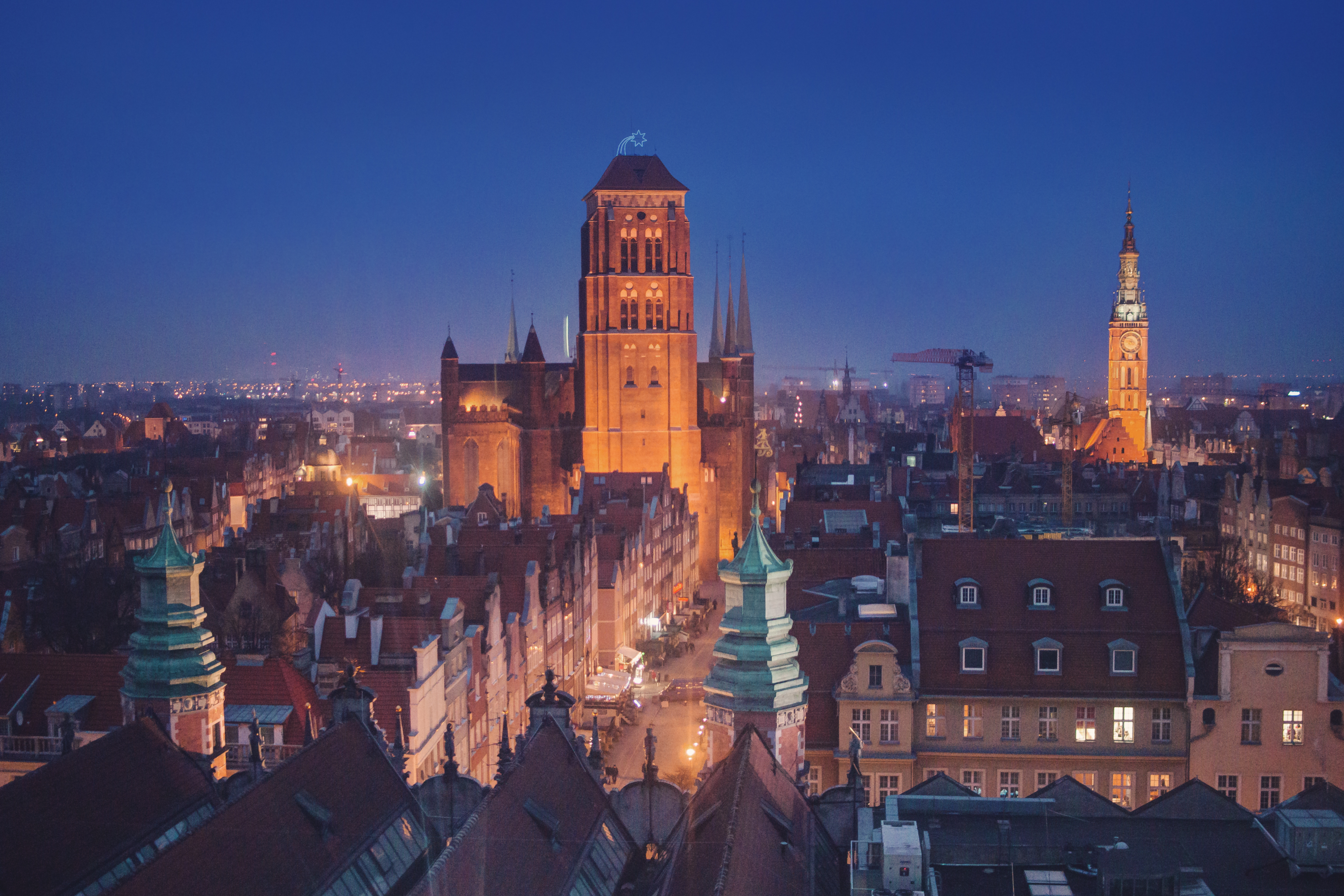
Gdańsk

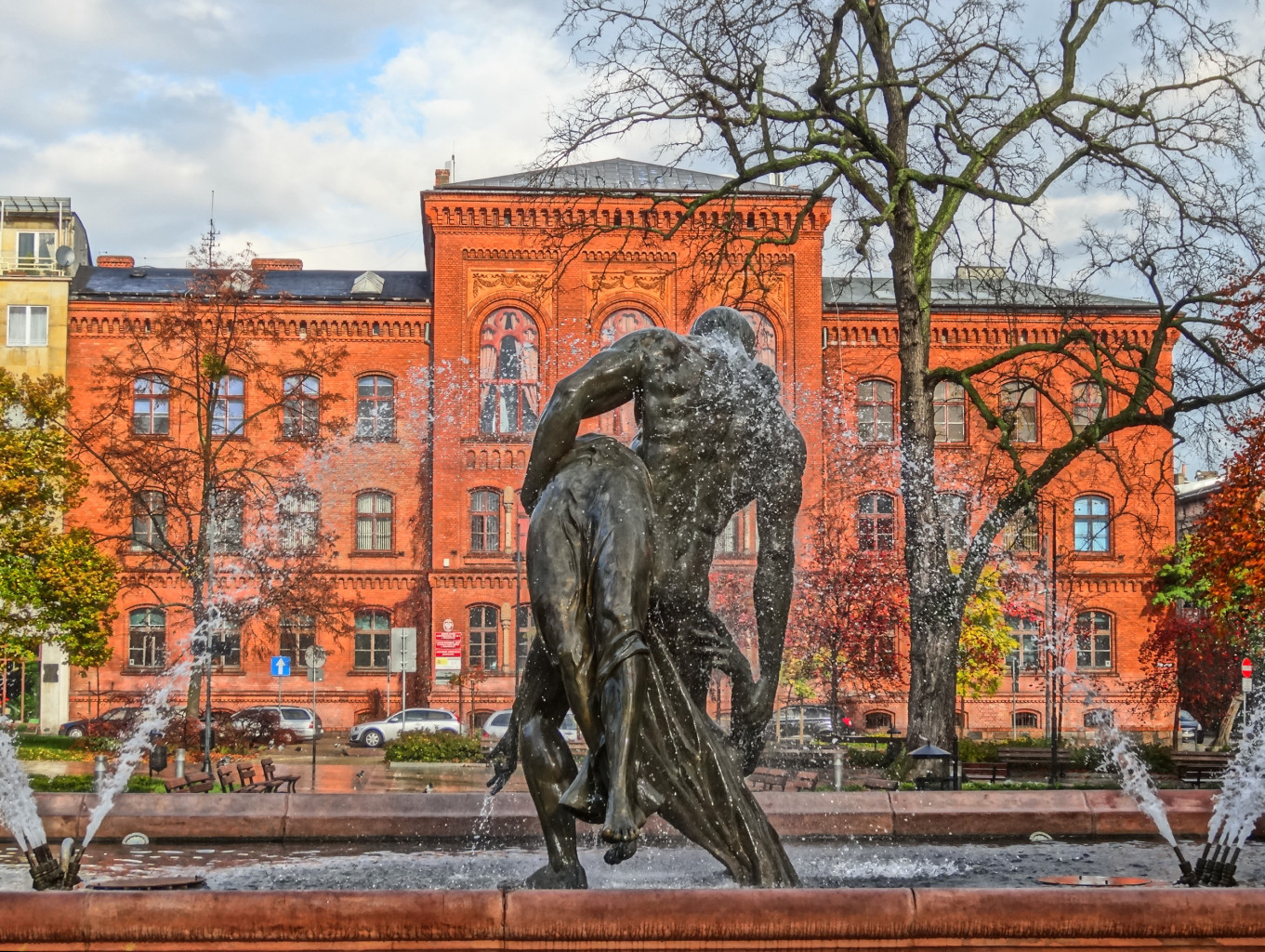
Bydgoszcz

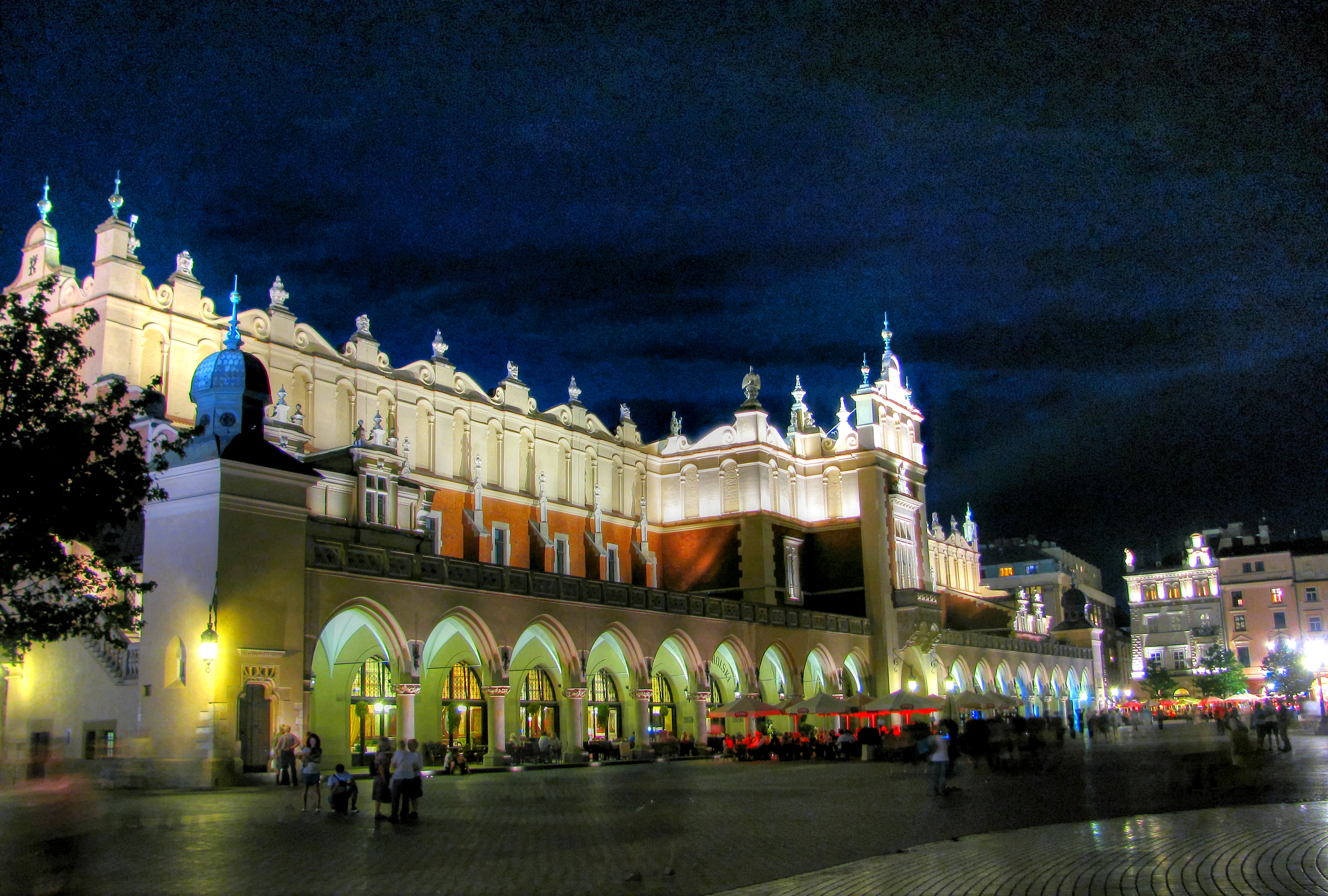
Kraków

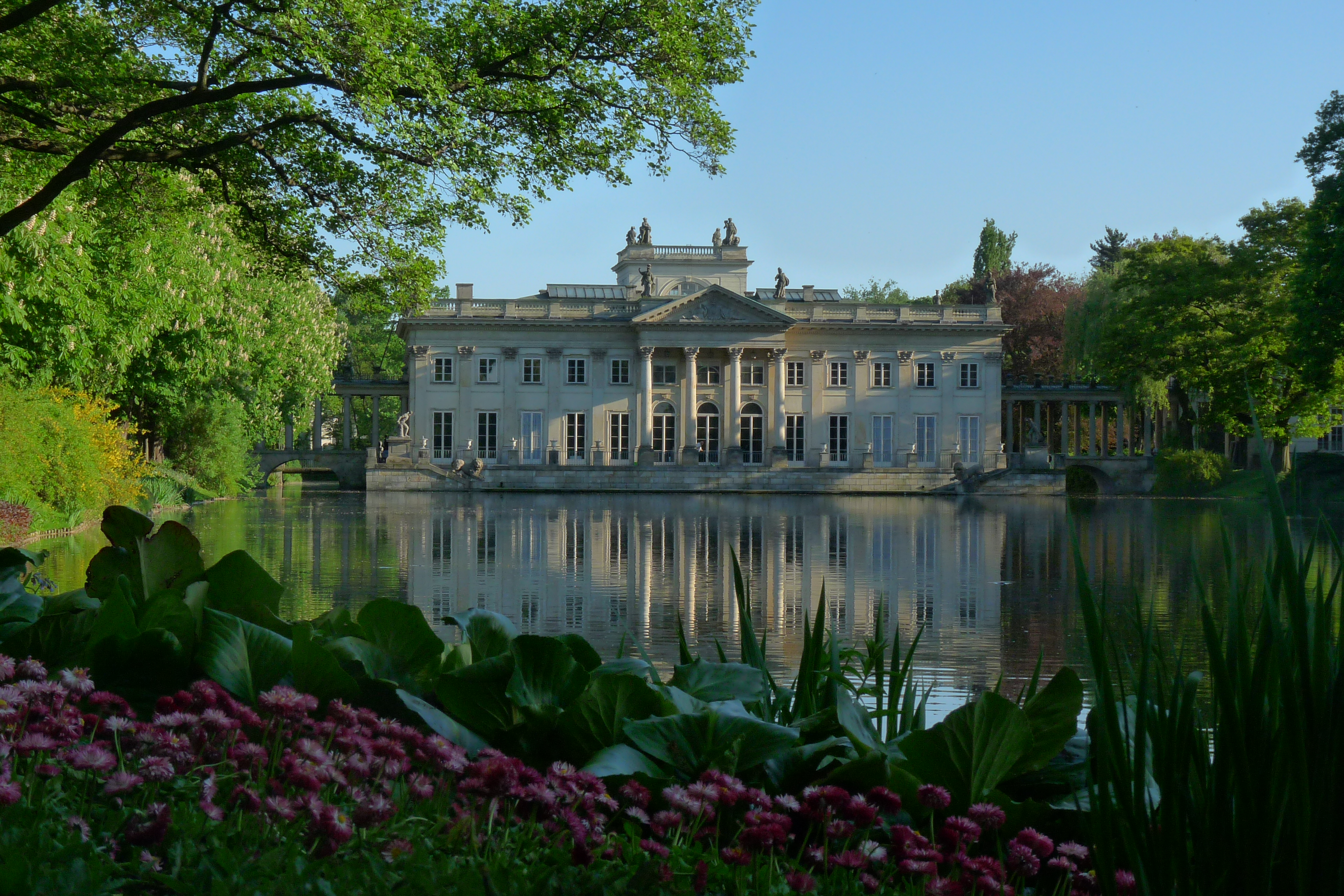
Warsaw

== Information ==
On 4 September 2008 the FIVB announced it had agreed a partnership deal for Poland to host the FIVB Men's Volleyball World Championship in 2014. "This will be the biggest and most beautiful sports event in the world, not only in volleyball but throughout the whole sports family," said FIVB Honorary Life President Rubén Acosta. "Poland – I'm sure about it – will make this championship very special."

Acosta and FIVB President Wei Jizhong agreed the deal in Warsaw following negotiations with the Polish Minister of Sport, Mirosław Drzewiecki; Mirosław Błaszczyk, President of the Board of Administration of Polsat Television; Polsat Television Sports Department Director, Marian Kmita and Polish Volleyball Federation President, Mirosław Przedpełski.

Volleyball in Poland has enjoyed a huge surge in popularity during the 2000s. The Polish Men's team finished as runners-up at the 2006 FIVB Men's Volleyball World Championship in Japan and a year later, Katowice hosted one of the best-ever FIVB Volleyball World League Final Rounds. The remaining 12 teams were drawn across the bottom three positions of each of the four first round pools.

A record number of 279 teams participated in the qualification process for the 2014 FIVB Volleyball World Championships. This total, coming from 166 national federations across the five FIVB confederations, represents an increase of 65 teams from the previous best of 214 teams from 119 federations for the 2010 World Championships (compared with 102 in 2006, 72 in 2002 and 63 in 1998).

== Qualification ==
The regional qualification stage determined the 24 teams that would compete in the championship competition. Hosts Poland were granted automatic qualification. Regional governing bodies were allocated the remaining 23 spots. Africa was granted three, Asia and Oceania four, Europe eight, North America five, and South America three places.

Africa (CAVB)	Asia and Oceania (AVC)	Europe (CEV)
Pool T winners: Cameroon; Pool U winners: Egypt; Pool V winners: Tunisia	Pool A winners: Australia; Pool B winners: Iran; Pool C winners: China; Pool D winners: South Korea	Host country: Poland; 2013 CEV champions: Russia; 2013 CEV runners-up: Italy; Pool I winners: Bulgaria; Pool J winners: Serbia; Pool K winners: Germany; Pool L winners: Belgium; Pool M winners: Finland; Third Round best runners-up: France

North America (NORCECA)	South America (CSV)
Pool O winners: United States; Pool P winners: Cuba; Pool Q winners: Canada; Pool R winners: Mexico; Playoff winners: Puerto Rico	2013 CSV champions: Brazil; 2013 CSV runners-up: Argentina; Qualifier winners: Venezuela

== Pools composition ==
=== First round ===
Teams were seeded in the first three positions of each pool following the serpentine system according to their FIVB World Ranking as of 7 October 2013. FIVB reserved the right to seed the hosts as head of pool A regardless of the World Ranking. All teams not seeded were drawn to take other available positions in the remaining lines, following the World Ranking. The draw was held in Warsaw, Poland on 27 January 2014. Because the CAVB and NORCECA qualification process were in progress on 27 January 2014, the best world rankings of CAVB (13, 15 and 19) and NORCECA (4, 7, 11, 20 and 22) were used when the draw was made. Rankings are shown in brackets except the hosts who ranked 5th.

Pool A	Pool B	Pool C	Pool D
Poland (5, Hosts)	Brazil (1)	Russia (2)	Italy (3)
Argentina (7)	Cuba (7, NOR 2)	Bulgaria (6)	United States (4, NOR 1)
Serbia (9)	Germany (10)	Canada (11, NOR 3)	Iran (12)
Australia (14)	Tunisia (13, CAVB 1)	Egypt (15, CAVB 2)	France (16)
Cameroon (19, CAVB 3)	South Korea (21)	China (18)	Puerto Rico (20, NOR 4)
Venezuela (31)	Finland (30)	Mexico (22, NOR 5)	Belgium (37)

=== Second round ===
Pool E		Pool F	
1A	Poland	1B	Brazil
1D	France	1C	Russia
2A	Serbia	2B	Germany
2D	Iran	2C	Canada
3A	Argentina	3B	Finland
3D	United States	3C	Bulgaria
4A	Australia	4B	Cuba
4D	Italy	4C	China

=== Third round ===
The third round draw was held in Łódź, Poland on 14 September 2014. The 1st ranked teams of pools E and F were placed in different pools, while the second and third placed teams were drawn.

Pool G		Pool H	
1E	France	1F	Brazil
3F	Germany	2E	Poland
3E	Iran	2F	Russia

== Venues ==
It was the first time Poland had hosted an FIVB Men's Volleyball World Championship. Matches were played in Kraków, Gdańsk, Wrocław, Katowice, Łódź, Bydgoszcz and Warsaw.

Pool A (only 30 August)	Pool A (excl. 30 August) and F	Pool B, F, G and Final four	Pool C
Warsaw, Poland	Wrocław, Poland	Katowice, Poland	Gdańsk, Poland
National Stadium	Centennial Hall	Spodek	Ergo Arena
Capacity: 62,100	Capacity: 10,000	Capacity: 11,500	Capacity: 11,409
Pool D	Pool E, H and 5th–6th places	Pool E	2014 FIVB Men's Volleyball World Championship is located in Poland
Kraków, Poland	Łódź, Poland	Bydgoszcz, Poland	2014 FIVB Men's Volleyball World Championship is located in Poland
Kraków Arena	Atlas Arena	Łuczniczka	2014 FIVB Men's Volleyball World Championship is located in Poland
Capacity: 15,328	Capacity: 13,805	Capacity: 8,500	2014 FIVB Men's Volleyball World Championship is located in Poland
		Interior	2014 FIVB Men's Volleyball World Championship is located in Poland

== Pool standing procedure ==
1. Match points
2. Number of matches won
3. Sets ratio
4. Points ratio
5. Result of the last match between the tied teams

Match won 3–0 or 3–1: 3 match points for the winner, 0 match points for the loser
Match won 3–2: 2 match points for the winner, 1 match point for the loser

== Opening ceremony and opening match ==
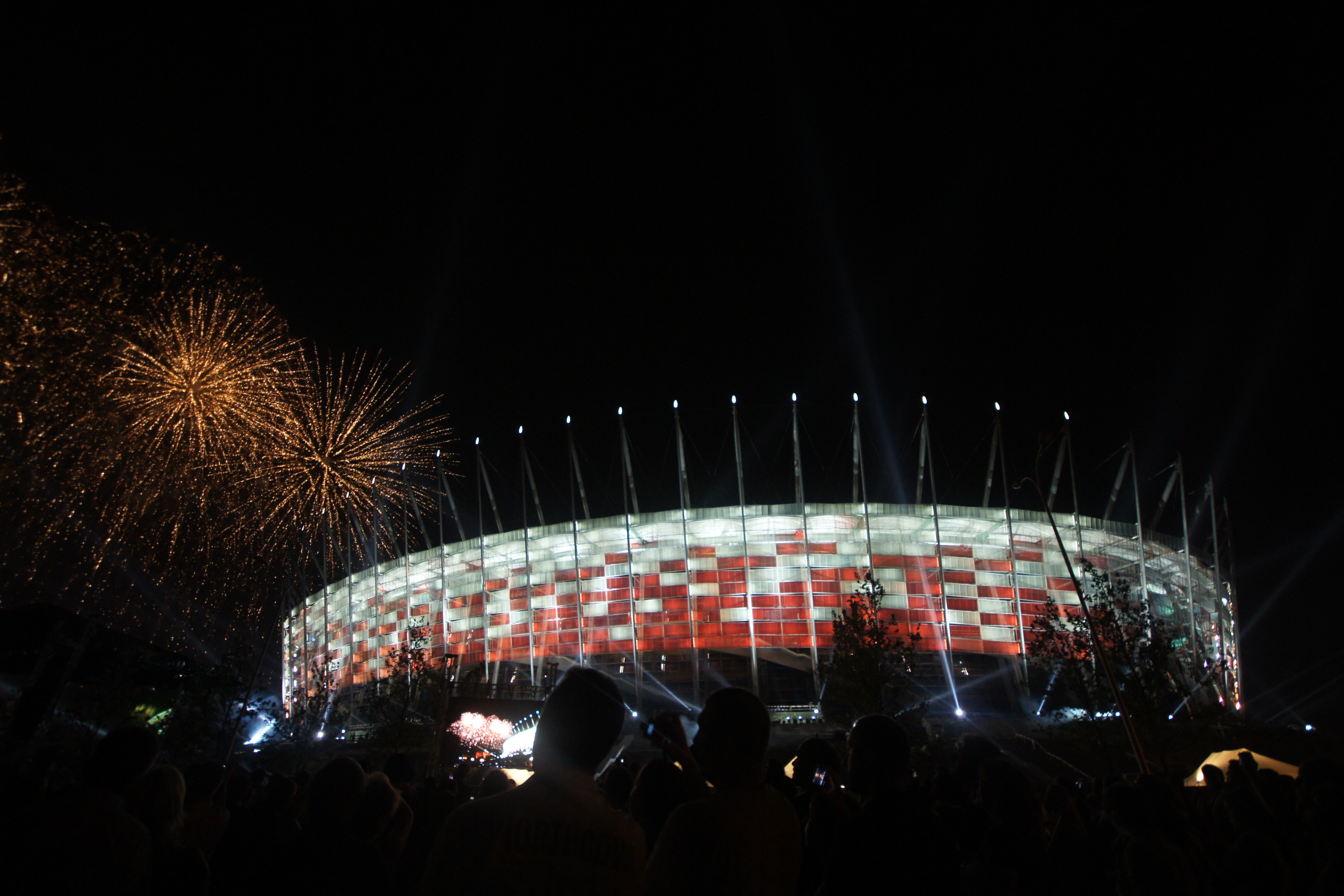
National Stadium, Warsaw

The 2014 World Championship began on 30 August with a dream opening match between the hosts and Serbia, who played to a record 62,000 spectators at National Stadium, Warsaw. Earlier, the opening ceremony took place with the participation of the President of Poland, Bronisław Komorowski.

== First round ==
- All times are Central European Summer Time (UTC+02:00).
- The top four teams in each pool qualified for the second round.

=== Pool A ===
Pos	Team	Pld	W	L	Pts	SW	SL	SR	SPW	SPL	SPR	Qualification
1	Poland	5	5	0	15	15	1	15.000	400	311	1.286	Second round
2	Serbia	5	4	1	12	12	6	2.000	425	396	1.073	Second round
3	Argentina	5	3	2	9	10	6	1.667	372	342	1.088	Second round
4	Australia	5	2	3	5	7	11	0.636	384	397	0.967	Second round
5	Venezuela	5	1	4	4	5	13	0.385	366	424	0.863	
6	Cameroon	5	0	5	0	3	15	0.200	382	459	0.832	

Date	Time		Score		Set 1	Set 2	Set 3	Set 4	Set 5	Total	Report
30 Aug	20:15	Poland	3–0	Serbia	25–19	25–18	25–18			75–55	P2 P3
31 Aug	16:30	Venezuela	0–3	Argentina	23–25	17–25	19–25			59–75	P2 P3
31 Aug	20:25	Cameroon	0–3	Australia	22–25	15–25	18–25			55–75	P2 P3
2 Sep	13:10	Argentina	1–3	Serbia	17–25	25–20	21–25	21–25		84–95	P2 P3
2 Sep	16:40	Venezuela	3–1	Cameroon	25–22	25–21	31–33	25–14		106–90	P2 P3
2 Sep	20:25	Australia	0–3	Poland	17–25	19–25	22–25			58–75	P2 P3
4 Sep	13:10	Cameroon	0–3	Argentina	17–25	18–25	23–25			58–75	P2 P3
4 Sep	16:40	Serbia	3–1	Australia	25–23	25–22	22–25	25–17		97–87	P2 P3
4 Sep	20:25	Poland	3–0	Venezuela	25–20	25–13	25–14			75–47	P2 P3
6 Sep	13:10	Argentina	3–0	Australia	25–18	25–19	25–18			75–55	P2 P3
6 Sep	16:40	Venezuela	0–3	Serbia	20–25	17–25	22–25			59–75	P2 P3
6 Sep	20:25	Cameroon	1–3	Poland	27–25	23–25	16–25	22–25		88–100	P2 P3
7 Sep	13:10	Australia	3–2	Venezuela	25–20	23–25	21–25	25–16	15–9	109–95	P2 P3
7 Sep	16:40	Poland	3–0	Argentina	25–20	25–20	25–23			75–63	P2 P3
7 Sep	20:25	Serbia	3–1	Cameroon	25–21	24–26	29–27	25–17		103–91	P2 P3

=== Pool B ===
Pos	Team	Pld	W	L	Pts	SW	SL	SR	SPW	SPL	SPR	Qualification
1	Brazil	5	5	0	14	15	3	5.000	428	352	1.216	Second round
2	Germany	5	4	1	12	12	5	2.400	398	338	1.178	Second round
3	Finland	5	3	2	8	10	8	1.250	415	396	1.048	Second round
4	Cuba	5	2	3	6	9	12	0.750	448	466	0.961	Second round
5	South Korea	5	1	4	4	6	13	0.462	390	441	0.884	
6	Tunisia	5	0	5	1	4	15	0.267	361	447	0.808	

Date	Time		Score		Set 1	Set 2	Set 3	Set 4	Set 5	Total	Report
1 Sep	13:10	Brazil	3–0	Germany	25–21	25–19	25–17			75–57	P2 P3
1 Sep	16:40	Finland	3–2	Cuba	18–25	21–25	27–25	25–23	15–12	106–110	P2 P3
1 Sep	20:25	South Korea	3–1	Tunisia	24–26	26–24	25–21	25–18		100–89	P2 P3
3 Sep	13:10	Cuba	0–3	Germany	16–25	21–25	19–25			56–75	P2 P3
3 Sep	16:40	Finland	3–0	South Korea	25–22	26–24	25–15			76–61	P2 P3
3 Sep	20:25	Tunisia	0–3	Brazil	18–25	10–25	17–25			45–75	P2 P3
5 Sep	13:10	South Korea	1–3	Cuba	21–25	25–23	14–25	22–25		82–98	P2 P3
5 Sep	16:40	Germany	3–1	Tunisia	25–13	25–19	21–25	25–12		96–69	P2 P3
5 Sep	20:25	Brazil	3–0	Finland	27–25	25–21	26–24			78–70	P2 P3
6 Sep	13:10	Cuba	3–2	Tunisia	16–25	25–20	25–23	20–25	15–13	101–106	P2 P3
6 Sep	16:40	Finland	1–3	Germany	20–25	25–19	24–26	19–25		88–95	P2 P3
6 Sep	20:25	South Korea	2–3	Brazil	25–21	13–25	21–25	25–17	13–15	97–103	P2 P3
7 Sep	13:10	Tunisia	0–3	Finland	18–25	14–25	20–25			52–75	P2 P3
7 Sep	16:40	Germany	3–0	South Korea	25–13	25–16	25–21			75–50	P2 P3
7 Sep	20:25	Brazil	3–1	Cuba	22–25	25–23	25–18	25–17		97–83	P2 P3

=== Pool C ===
Pos	Team	Pld	W	L	Pts	SW	SL	SR	SPW	SPL	SPR	Qualification
1	Russia	5	5	0	14	15	3	5.000	429	347	1.236	Second round
2	Canada	5	4	1	11	12	5	2.400	392	349	1.123	Second round
3	Bulgaria	5	3	2	10	13	8	1.625	462	437	1.057	Second round
4	China	5	2	3	6	6	11	0.545	386	408	0.946	Second round
5	Mexico	5	1	4	2	5	14	0.357	370	442	0.837	
6	Egypt	5	0	5	2	5	15	0.333	411	467	0.880	

Date	Time		Score		Set 1	Set 2	Set 3	Set 4	Set 5	Total	Report
1 Sep	13:10	Russia	3–0	Canada	25–21	25–19	25–21			75–61	P2 P3
1 Sep	16:40	Mexico	0–3	Bulgaria	16–25	17–25	21–25			54–75	P2 P3
1 Sep	20:25	China	3–1	Egypt	25–20	25–20	23–25	33–31		106–96	P2 P3
3 Sep	13:10	Bulgaria	2–3	Canada	25–17	17–25	25–20	24–26	8–15	99–103	P2 P3
3 Sep	16:40	Mexico	1–3	China	25–20	19–25	20–25	20–25		84–95	P2 P3
3 Sep	20:25	Egypt	0–3	Russia	22–25	15–25	15–25			52–75	P2 P3
5 Sep	13:10	China	0–3	Bulgaria	23–25	23–25	19–25			65–75	P2 P3
5 Sep	16:40	Canada	3–0	Egypt	25–14	25–19	25–22			75–55	P2 P3
5 Sep	20:25	Russia	3–1	Mexico	21–25	25–20	25–14	25–17		96–76	P2 P3
6 Sep	13:10	Bulgaria	3–2	Egypt	25–22	26–24	23–25	20–25	15–11	109–107	P2 P3
6 Sep	16:40	Mexico	0–3	Canada	17–25	18–25	19–25			54–75	P2 P3
6 Sep	20:25	China	0–3	Russia	22–25	11–25	21–25			54–75	P2 P3
7 Sep	13:10	Egypt	2–3	Mexico	25–16	20–25	21–25	25–21	10–15	101–102	P2 P3
7 Sep	16:40	Canada	3–0	China	26–24	27–25	25–17			78–66	P2 P3
7 Sep	20:25	Russia	3–2	Bulgaria	20–25	23–25	25–20	25–23	15–11	108–104	P2 P3

=== Pool D ===
Pos	Team	Pld	W	L	Pts	SW	SL	SR	SPW	SPL	SPR	Qualification
1	France	5	4	1	12	14	7	2.000	469	437	1.073	Second round
2	Iran	5	4	1	11	13	7	1.857	462	420	1.100	Second round
3	United States	5	3	2	9	12	9	1.333	461	419	1.100	Second round
4	Italy	5	2	3	5	9	12	0.750	462	473	0.977	Second round
5	Belgium	5	1	4	5	9	12	0.750	437	467	0.936	
6	Puerto Rico	5	1	4	3	3	13	0.231	315	390	0.808	

Date	Time		Score		Set 1	Set 2	Set 3	Set 4	Set 5	Total	Report
31 Aug	13:10	Italy	1–3	Iran	16–25	25–23	21–25	22–25		84–98	P2 P3
31 Aug	16:40	Belgium	2–3	United States	21–25	25–17	16–25	25–21	11–15	98–103	P2 P3
31 Aug	20:25	Puerto Rico	0–3	France	23–25	22–25	24–26			69–76	P2 P3
2 Sep	13:10	United States	2–3	Iran	23–25	19–25	25–19	25–18	15–17	107–104	P2 P3
2 Sep	16:40	Belgium	3–0	Puerto Rico	25–19	25–17	25–20			75–56	P2 P3
2 Sep	20:25	France	2–3	Italy	25–20	25–20	23–25	13–25	12–15	98–105	P2 P3
4 Sep	13:10	Puerto Rico	0–3	United States	15–25	8–25	20–25			43–75	P2 P3
4 Sep	16:40	Iran	1–3	France	18–25	25–14	19–25	27–29		89–93	P2 P3
4 Sep	20:25	Italy	3–1	Belgium	26–28	25–15	25–16	28–26		104–85	P2 P3
6 Sep	13:10	United States	1–3	France	25–19	17–25	15–25	21–25		78–94	P2 P3
6 Sep	16:40	Belgium	1–3	Iran	23–25	15–25	25–21	20–25		83–96	P2 P3
6 Sep	20:25	Puerto Rico	3–1	Italy	19–25	25–19	25–23	25–22		94–89	P2 P3
7 Sep	13:10	France	3–2	Belgium	25–14	21–25	25–20	22–25	15–12	108–96	P2 P3
7 Sep	16:40	Iran	3–0	Puerto Rico	25–17	25–22	25–14			75–53	P2 P3
7 Sep	20:25	Italy	1–3	United States	18–25	20–25	25–23	17–25		80–98	P2 P3

== Second round ==
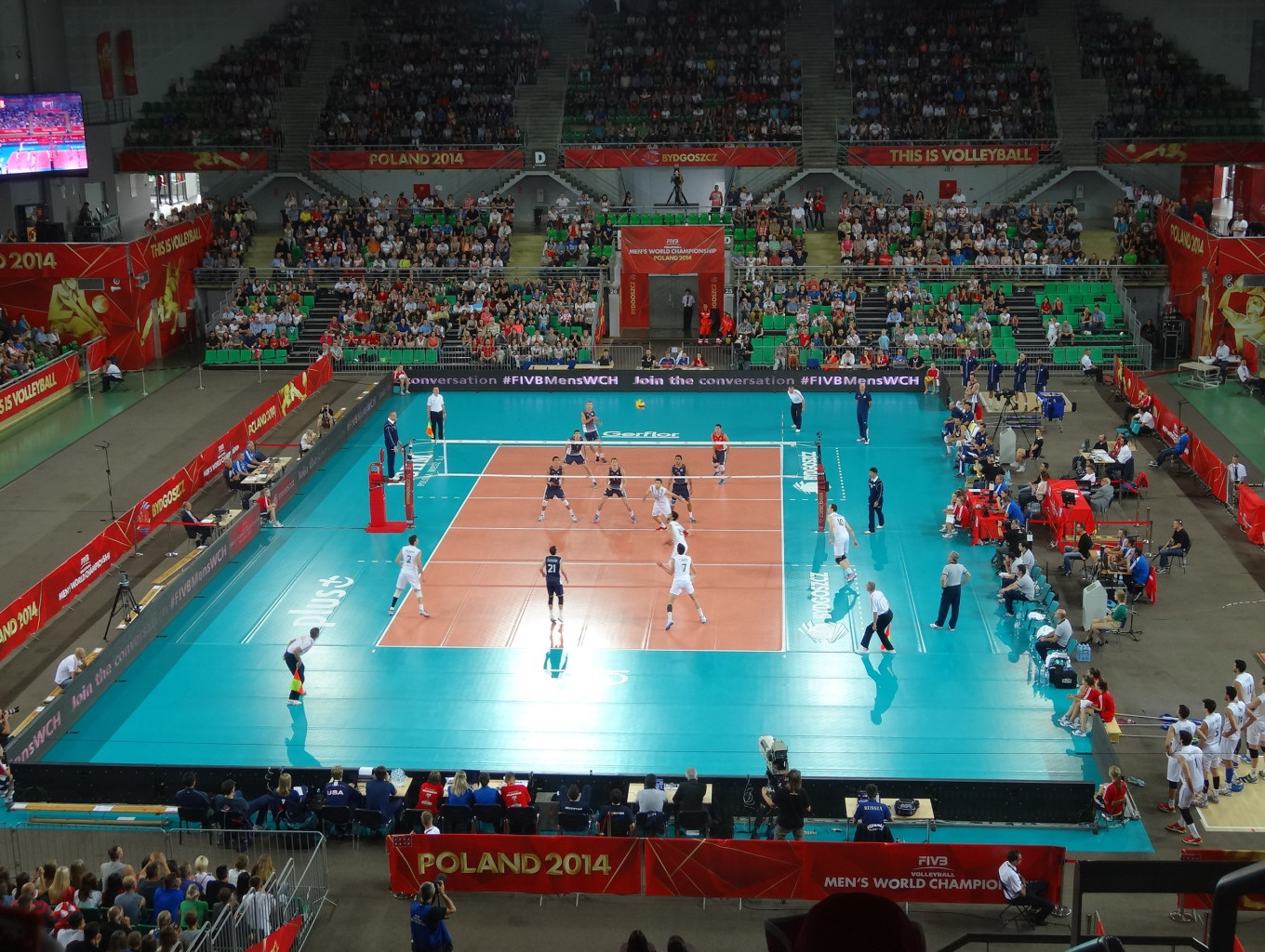
Argentina vs. United States.

- All times are Central European Summer Time (UTC+02:00).
- The results and the points of the matches between the same teams that were already played during the first round were taken into account for the second round.
- The top three teams in each pool qualified for the third round.

=== Pool E ===
Pos	Team	Pld	W	L	Pts	SW	SL	SR	SPW	SPL	SPR	Qualification
1	France	7	5	2	17	19	11	1.727	693	649	1.068	Third round
2	Poland	7	6	1	16	19	8	2.375	636	568	1.120	Third round
3	Iran	7	5	2	15	18	11	1.636	659	623	1.058	Third round
4	United States	7	4	3	14	17	12	1.417	673	633	1.063	
5	Serbia	7	3	4	9	12	14	0.857	601	617	0.974	
6	Argentina	7	3	4	8	11	15	0.733	570	602	0.947	
7	Italy	7	2	5	5	10	18	0.556	615	645	0.953	
8	Australia	7	0	7	0	4	21	0.190	509	619	0.822	

Date	Time	Venue		Score		Set 1	Set 2	Set 3	Set 4	Set 5	Total	Report
10 Sep	16:40	ŁUC	Argentina	1–3	France	25–21	17–25	27–29	18–25		87–100	P2 P3
10 Sep	16:40	ATA	Serbia	3–0	Italy	25–19	29–27	25–22			79–68	P2 P3
10 Sep	20:25	ATA	Poland	1–3	United States	27–29	22–25	27–25	23–25		99–104	P2 P3
10 Sep	20:25	ŁUC	Australia	1–3	Iran	23–25	21–25	25–21	17–25		86–96	P2 P3
11 Sep	16:40	ŁUC	Argentina	0–3	Iran	15–25	23–25	16–25			54–75	P2 P3
11 Sep	16:40	ATA	Serbia	1–3	United States	25–23	29–31	17–25	21–25		92–104	P2 P3
11 Sep	20:25	ATA	Poland	3–1	Italy	19–25	25–18	25–20	26–24		95–87	P2 P3
11 Sep	20:25	ŁUC	Australia	1–3	France	22–25	18–25	32–30	17–25		89–105	P2 P3
13 Sep	16:40	ŁUC	Argentina	3–1	Italy	17–25	25–21	30–28	25–21		97–95	P2 P3
13 Sep	16:40	ATA	Serbia	1–3	France	27–25	23–25	23–25	20–25		93–100	P2 P3
13 Sep	20:25	ATA	Poland	3–2	Iran	25–17	25–16	24–26	19–25	16–14	109–98	P2 P3
13 Sep	20:25	ŁUC	Australia	0–3	United States	15–25	19–25	20–25			54–75	P2 P3
14 Sep	16:40	ŁUC	Argentina	3–2	United States	19–25	28–26	25–20	23–25	15–11	110–107	P2 P3
14 Sep	16:40	ATA	Serbia	1–3	Iran	25–27	25–22	22–25	18–25		90–99	P2 P3
14 Sep	20:25	ATA	Poland	3–2	France	25–18	21–25	25–23	22–25	15–12	108–103	P2 P3
14 Sep	20:25	ŁUC	Australia	1–3	Italy	23–25	14–25	25–21	18–25		80–96	P2 P3

=== Pool F ===
Pos	Team	Pld	W	L	Pts	SW	SL	SR	SPW	SPL	SPR	Qualification
1	Brazil	7	7	0	21	21	2	10.500	578	476	1.214	Third round
2	Russia	7	6	1	17	19	6	3.167	592	498	1.189	Third round
3	Germany	7	5	2	15	15	8	1.875	537	497	1.080	Third round
4	Canada	7	4	3	10	12	13	0.923	574	560	1.025	
5	Finland	7	2	5	6	9	17	0.529	561	602	0.932	
6	Cuba	7	1	6	6	11	18	0.611	601	660	0.911	
7	Bulgaria	7	1	6	5	8	18	0.444	534	604	0.884	
8	China	7	2	5	4	6	19	0.316	508	588	0.864	

Date	Time	Venue		Score		Set 1	Set 2	Set 3	Set 4	Set 5	Total	Report
10 Sep	16:40	SPO	Brazil	3–0	Bulgaria	25–15	25–21	25–21			75–57	P2 P3
10 Sep	16:40	CEH	Finland	0–3	Russia	10–25	18–25	16–25			44–75	P2 P3
10 Sep	20:25	SPO	Germany	3–0	China	25–19	25–22	25–17			75–58	P2 P3
10 Sep	20:25	CEH	Cuba	2–3	Canada	27–25	18–25	25–23	11–25	13–15	94–113	P2 P3
11 Sep	16:40	SPO	Brazil	3–0	China	25–14	25–23	25–18			75–55	P2 P3
11 Sep	16:40	CEH	Finland	0–3	Canada	25–27	25–27	19–25			69–79	P2 P3
11 Sep	20:25	SPO	Germany	3–1	Bulgaria	25–16	25–15	23–25	25–17		98–73	P2 P3
11 Sep	20:25	CEH	Cuba	1–3	Russia	18–25	25–23	15–25	19–25		77–98	P2 P3
13 Sep	16:40	SPO	Brazil	3–0	Canada	25–19	25–23	29–27			79–69	P2 P3
13 Sep	16:40	CEH	Finland	2–3	China	25–22	22–25	23–25	25–20	14–16	109–108	P2 P3
13 Sep	20:25	SPO	Germany	0–3	Russia	17–25	18–25	24–26			59–76	P2 P3
13 Sep	20:25	CEH	Cuba	3–0	Bulgaria	25–23	25–18	30–28			80–69	P2 P3
14 Sep	16:40	SPO	Brazil	3–1	Russia	25–21	24–26	25–19	25–19		99–85	P2 P3
14 Sep	16:40	CEH	Finland	3–0	Bulgaria	25–18	25–21	25–18			75–57	P2 P3
14 Sep	20:25	SPO	Germany	3–0	Canada	28–26	25–22	25–23			78–71	P2 P3
14 Sep	20:25	CEH	Cuba	2–3	China	25–19	20–25	25–18	20–25	11–15	101–102	P2 P3

== Third round ==
- All times are Central European Summer Time (UTC+02:00).
- The top two teams in each pool qualified for the semifinals, whereas the third ranked teams in each pool qualified for the 5th place match.

=== Pool G ===
Pos	Team	Pld	W	L	Pts	SW	SL	SR	SPW	SPL	SPR	Qualification
1	France	2	2	0	5	6	2	3.000	182	163	1.117	Semifinals
2	Germany	2	1	1	3	3	3	1.000	136	131	1.038	Semifinals
3	Iran	2	0	2	1	2	6	0.333	157	181	0.867	5th place match

Date	Time		Score		Set 1	Set 2	Set 3	Set 4	Set 5	Total	Report
16 Sep	20:25	France	3–0	Germany	25–15	26–24	25–22			76–61	P2 P3
17 Sep	20:25	Germany	3–0	Iran	25–15	25–21	25–19			75–55	P2 P3
18 Sep	20:25	France	3–2	Iran	25–20	25–23	22–25	19–25	15–9	106–102	P2 P3

=== Pool H ===
Pos	Team	Pld	W	L	Pts	SW	SL	SR	SPW	SPL	SPR	Qualification
1	Poland	2	2	0	4	6	4	1.500	211	210	1.005	Semifinals
2	Brazil	2	1	1	4	5	3	1.667	180	166	1.084	Semifinals
3	Russia	2	0	2	1	2	6	0.333	168	183	0.918	5th place match

Date	Time		Score		Set 1	Set 2	Set 3	Set 4	Set 5	Total	Report
16 Sep	20:25	Poland	3–2	Brazil	25–22	22–25	14–25	25–18	17–15	103–105	P2 P3
17 Sep	20:25	Brazil	3–0	Russia	25–22	25–20	25–21			75–63	P2 P3
18 Sep	20:25	Poland	3–2	Russia	25–22	25–22	21–25	22–25	15–11	108–105	P2 P3

== Final round ==
- All times are Central European Summer Time (UTC+02:00).

=== 5th–6th places ===
==== 5th place match ====
Date	Time		Score		Set 1	Set 2	Set 3	Set 4	Set 5	Total	Report
20 Sep	13:40	Iran	0–3	Russia	19–25	21–25	18–25			58–75	P2 P3

=== Final four ===
Semifinals
20 September
France	2
Brazil	3
20 September
Germany	1
Poland	3

Final
21 September
Brazil	1
Poland	3
3rd place match
21 September
France	0
Germany	3

==== Semifinals ====
Date	Time		Score		Set 1	Set 2	Set 3	Set 4	Set 5	Total	Report
20 Sep	16:40	France	2–3	Brazil	18–25	25–23	23–25	25–22	12–15	103–110	P2 P3
20 Sep	20:25	Germany	1–3	Poland	24–26	26–28	25–23	21–25		96–102	P2 P3

==== 3rd place match ====
Date	Time		Score		Set 1	Set 2	Set 3	Set 4	Set 5	Total	Report
21 Sep	16:40	France	0–3	Germany	21–25	24–26	23–25			68–76	P2 P3

==== Final ====
Date	Time		Score		Set 1	Set 2	Set 3	Set 4	Set 5	Total	Report
21 Sep	20:25	Brazil	1–3	Poland	25–18	22–25	23–25	22–25		92–93	P2 P3

== Final standing ==
Rank	Team
1st place, gold medalist(s)	Poland
2nd place, silver medalist(s)	Brazil
3rd place, bronze medalist(s)	Germany
4	France
5	Russia
6	Iran
7	Canada
7	United States
9	Finland
9	Serbia
11	Argentina
11	Cuba
13	Bulgaria
13	Italy
15	Australia
15	China
17	Belgium
17	Mexico
17	South Korea
17	Venezuela
21	Cameroon
21	Egypt
21	Puerto Rico
21	Tunisia

Qualified for the 2015 World Cup

2014 World Champions

Poland
Second title

Team roster: Piotr Nowakowski, Michał Winiarski, Dawid Konarski, Paweł Zagumny, Karol Kłos, Andrzej Wrona, Mariusz Wlazły, Fabian Drzyzga, Michał Kubiak, Krzysztof Ignaczak, Paweł Zatorski, Marcin Możdżonek, Mateusz Mika, Rafał Buszek
Head coach: Stéphane Antiga

== Awards ==
- Most valuable player
  (Poland) Mariusz Wlazły
- Best setter
  (Germany) Lukas Kampa
- Best outside spikers
  (Brazil) Ricardo Lucarelli
  (Brazil) Murilo Endres
- Best middle blockers
  (Germany) Marcus Böhme
  (Poland) Karol Kłos
- Best opposite spiker
  (Poland) Mariusz Wlazły
- Best libero
  (France) Jenia Grebennikov

== Prize money ==
- Prize Money for the Final Standing
  Champions – $200,000
  Runners-up – $125,000
  3rd place – $75,000
- Prize Money for the Awards
  Most Valuable Player – $30,000
  Best Setter – $10,000
  Best Outside Spiker – $10,000 (2 players)
  Best Middle Blocker – $10,000 (2 players)
  Best Opposite Spiker – $10,000
  Best Libero – $10,000

== Marketing ==
=== Sponsors ===
- KGHM Polska Miedź
- Polsat
- PKN Orlen
- Adidas
- Samsung
- Wirtualna Polska
- Plus
- Radio ZET

=== Official song ===
The competition's official opening song was "Start a Fire" by Margaret. She also performed the song at the 2014 FIVB Men's Volleyball World Championship opening ceremony on August 30 at the National Stadium, Warsaw, prior to the Poland v. Serbia match. This event was transmitted in over 168 countries.

== Trophy ==
The FIVB then mandated two young product designers from Switzerland, Thilo Alex Brunner and Jörg Mettler to create the new World Championship trophy. With its unique contemporary design, the trophy has set itself apart from other awards in international competitions across the sporting world. Eichenberger LTD and their mastermind, Juan Franco, have been responsible for its production. The company specialises in complex metal works mainly for the Swiss watchmaking and jewellery industry.

== Broadcasting ==
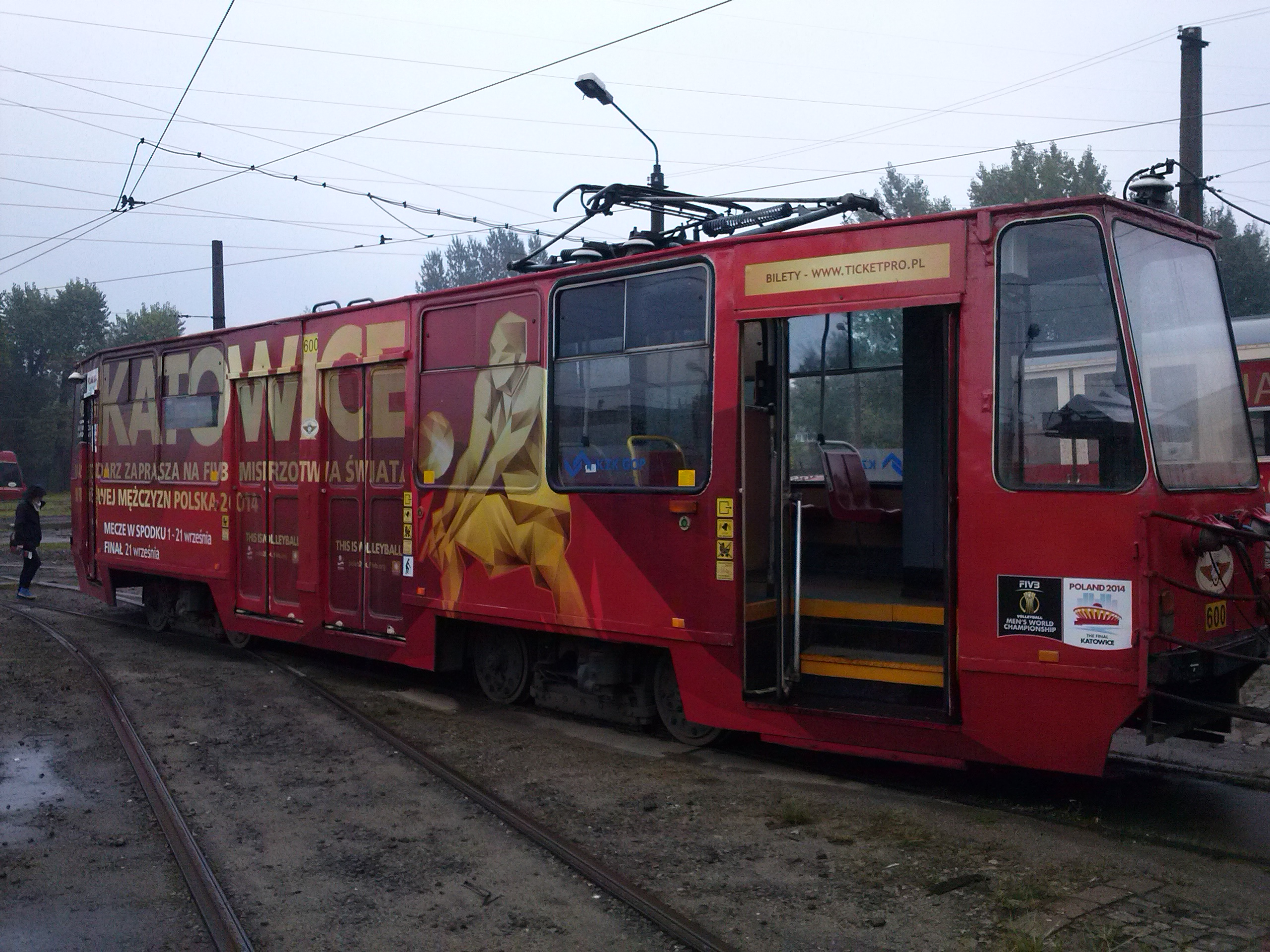
Advertising the World Championships in Katowice

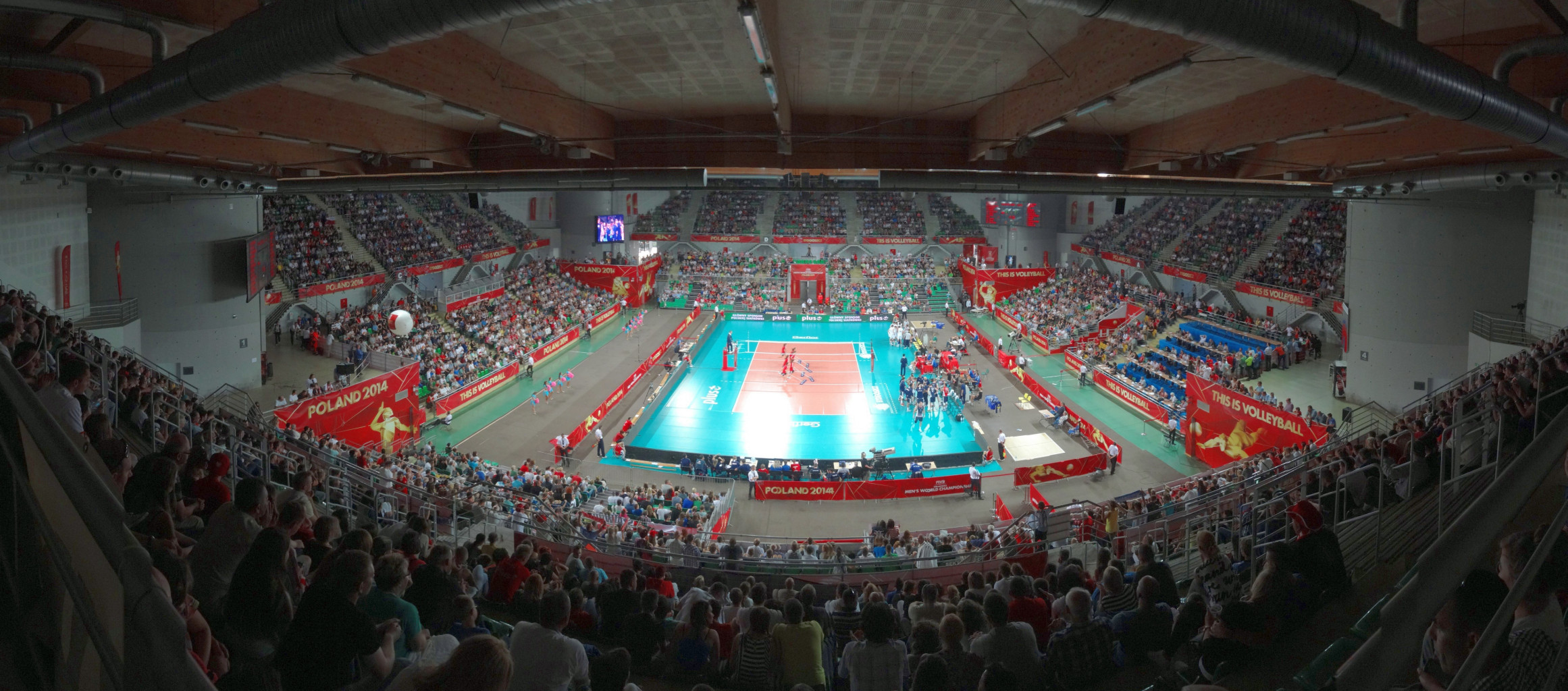
USA v Argentina 14 September 2014 in Łuczniczka

Region	TV station
Europe
Belgium	VRT
Bulgaria	Nova TV - Nova Sports
Finland	YLE
France	BeIN Sport
Macedonia	MRT
Germany	ZDF
Poland	Polsat
Russia	VGTRK
Romania	Romtelecom
Serbia	RTS
Italy	RAI
Rest of the world
Sub-Saharan Africa i South Africa	SuperSport International
North Africa	BeIN Sport
Central America - Caribbean	SKY México
North America	BeIN Sport
Near East	BeIN Sport - Dubai Sport
Argentina	TyC Sports
Brazil	SporTV - Globosat
China	CCTV
Japan	TBS
Venezuela	TVes
United States	BeIN Sport
Worldwide
Perform	Live Sport TV

Source: FIVB.com

== Fans ==
More than a half million fans (563,263) have watched the matches so far, smashing the previous records in the competition. In Italy four years ago, the total was 339,324, while in Japan in 2006 it was 298,352. The first round alone topped the numbers achieved by the World Championship in Italy four years ago. The average number of spectators per match was 5,469. Not surprisingly, Poland have been the most popular team with a total of 173,234 fans attending their games, 60,000 more than the second-ranked team Serbia.

== See also ==
- 2014 FIVB Volleyball Women's World Championship
