= Volleyball at the 2004 Summer Olympics – Men's European qualification =

The European qualification for the 2004 Men's Olympic Volleyball Tournament was held from 7 September 2003 to 10 January 2004.

== Elimination round ==
- Dates: 7–21 September 2003
- All times are local.
- In case of an aggregate set tie, teams compare an aggregate point to determine the winner.

| Team 1 | Agg. | Team 2 | 1st leg | 2nd leg |
|---|---|---|---|---|
| Hungary | 6–1 | Azerbaijan | 3–1 | 3–0 |
| Denmark | 1–6 | Slovenia | 1–3 | 0–3 |
| Latvia | 2–6 | Croatia | 2–3 | 0–3 |
| Estonia | 3–3^{1} | Turkey | 3–0 | 0–3 |

^{1} Estonia won 133–130 on the aggregate point.

=== First leg ===
| Date | Time | | Score | | Set 1 | Set 2 | Set 3 | Set 4 | Set 5 | Total |
|---|---|---|---|---|---|---|---|---|---|---|
| 7 Sep | 13:00 | Estonia | 3–0 | Turkey | 25–16 | 25–21 | 25–18 | | | 75–55 |
| 7 Sep | 17:00 | Latvia | 2–3 | Croatia | 25–20 | 25–18 | 23–25 | 23–25 | 13–15 | 109–103 |
| 7 Sep | 19:00 | Denmark | 1–3 | Slovenia | 19–25 | 25–19 | 21–25 | 22–25 | | 87–94 |
| 17 Sep | 18:00 | Hungary | 3–1 | Azerbaijan | 25–13 | 23–25 | 25–19 | 25–19 | | 98–76 |

=== Second leg ===
| Date | Time | | Score | | Set 1 | Set 2 | Set 3 | Set 4 | Set 5 | Total |
|---|---|---|---|---|---|---|---|---|---|---|
| 18 Sep | 18:00 | Hungary | 3–0 | Azerbaijan | 25–13 | 25–18 | 25–18 | | | 75–49 |
| 20 Sep | 14:00 | Turkey | 3–0 | Estonia | 25–17 | 25–18 | 25–23 | | | 75–58 |
| 20 Sep | 17:00 | Croatia | 3–0 | Latvia | 25–15 | 25–20 | 25–18 | | | 75–53 |
| 21 Sep | 18:00 | Slovenia | 3–0 | Denmark | 25–22 | 25–15 | 25–20 | | | 75–57 |

== Pre–qualification tournament ==
- Host: Kuopio, Finland
- Dates: 19–23 November 2003
- All times are Eastern European Time (UTC+02:00).

=== Preliminary round ===
==== Pool A ====
| Pos | Team | Pld | W | L | Pts | SW | SL | SR | SPW | SPL | SPR | Qualification |
|---|---|---|---|---|---|---|---|---|---|---|---|---|
| 1 | Ukraine | 2 | 2 | 0 | 4 | 6 | 2 | 3.000 | 196 | 170 | 1.153 | Semifinals |
| 2 | Slovenia | 2 | 1 | 1 | 3 | 4 | 5 | 0.800 | 193 | 198 | 0.975 | Semifinals |
| 3 | Croatia | 2 | 0 | 2 | 2 | 3 | 6 | 0.500 | 182 | 203 | 0.897 | |

| Date | Time | | Score | | Set 1 | Set 2 | Set 3 | Set 4 | Set 5 | Total |
|---|---|---|---|---|---|---|---|---|---|---|
| 19 Nov | 20:30 | Ukraine | 3–1 | Slovenia | 25–27 | 25–21 | 25–20 | 25–18 | | 100–86 |
| 20 Nov | 18:00 | Croatia | 1–3 | Ukraine | 25–21 | 17–25 | 19–25 | 23–25 | | 84–96 |
| 21 Nov | 20:30 | Slovenia | 3–2 | Croatia | 25–17 | 25–21 | 23–25 | 19–25 | 15–10 | 107–98 |

==== Pool B ====
| Pos | Team | Pld | W | L | Pts | SW | SL | SR | SPW | SPL | SPR | Qualification |
|---|---|---|---|---|---|---|---|---|---|---|---|---|
| 1 | Hungary | 2 | 2 | 0 | 4 | 6 | 2 | 3.000 | 182 | 147 | 1.238 | Semifinals |
| 2 | Finland | 2 | 1 | 1 | 3 | 5 | 5 | 1.000 | 203 | 206 | 0.985 | Semifinals |
| 3 | Estonia | 2 | 0 | 2 | 2 | 2 | 6 | 0.333 | 148 | 180 | 0.822 | |

| Date | Time | | Score | | Set 1 | Set 2 | Set 3 | Set 4 | Set 5 | Total |
|---|---|---|---|---|---|---|---|---|---|---|
| 19 Nov | 18:00 | Finland | 3–2 | Estonia | 25–19 | 18–25 | 22–25 | 25–22 | 15–8 | 105–99 |
| 20 Nov | 14:30 | Estonia | 0–3 | Hungary | 13–25 | 16–25 | 20–25 | | | 49–75 |
| 21 Nov | 18:00 | Hungary | 3–2 | Finland | 18–25 | 24–26 | 25–21 | 25–20 | 15–6 | 107–98 |

=== Final round ===
Semifinals
22 November
Ukraine | 1
Finland | 3
22 November
Slovenia | 3
Hungary | 0

Final
23 November
Finland | 3
Slovenia | 1

==== Semifinals ====
| Date | Time | | Score | | Set 1 | Set 2 | Set 3 | Set 4 | Set 5 | Total |
|---|---|---|---|---|---|---|---|---|---|---|
| 22 Nov | 14:00 | Ukraine | 1–3 | Finland | 19–25 | 28–26 | 23–25 | 23–25 | | 93–101 |
| 22 Nov | 16:30 | Slovenia | 3–0 | Hungary | 25–17 | 25–18 | 25–15 | | | 75–50 |

==== Final ====
| Date | Time | | Score | | Set 1 | Set 2 | Set 3 | Set 4 | Set 5 | Total |
|---|---|---|---|---|---|---|---|---|---|---|
| 23 Nov | 15:00 | Finland | 3–1 | Slovenia | 23–25 | 25–17 | 25–21 | 25–21 | | 98–84 |

=== Final standing ===
| Rank | Team |
|---|---|
| 1 | Finland |
| 2 | Slovenia |
| 3 | Hungary |
| 3 | Ukraine |
| 5 | Croatia |
| 5 | Estonia |

| Qualified for the Qualification tournament |

== Qualification tournament ==
- Venue: Arena Leipzig, Leipzig, Germany
- Dates: 5–10 January 2004
- All times are Central European Time (UTC+01:00).

=== Preliminary round ===
==== Pool A ====
| Pos | Team | Pld | W | L | Pts | SW | SL | SR | SPW | SPL | SPR | Qualification |
|---|---|---|---|---|---|---|---|---|---|---|---|---|
| 1 | Russia | 3 | 3 | 0 | 6 | 9 | 0 | MAX | 230 | 180 | 1.278 | Semifinals |
| 2 | Germany | 3 | 1 | 2 | 4 | 5 | 6 | 0.833 | 248 | 249 | 0.996 | Semifinals |
| 3 | Bulgaria | 3 | 1 | 2 | 4 | 3 | 6 | 0.500 | 190 | 206 | 0.922 | |
| 4 | Poland | 3 | 1 | 2 | 4 | 3 | 8 | 0.375 | 222 | 255 | 0.871 | |

| Date | Time | | Score | | Set 1 | Set 2 | Set 3 | Set 4 | Set 5 | Total |
|---|---|---|---|---|---|---|---|---|---|---|
| 5 Jan | 17:30 | Bulgaria | 0–3 | Germany | 19–25 | 19–25 | 18–25 | | | 56–75 |
| 6 Jan | 15:00 | Bulgaria | 0–3 | Russia | 20–25 | 20–25 | 19–25 | | | 59–75 |
| 6 Jan | 20:00 | Germany | 2–3 | Poland | 25–22 | 16–25 | 27–25 | 24–26 | 13–15 | 105–113 |
| 7 Jan | 17:30 | Russia | 3–0 | Poland | 25–19 | 25–16 | 25–18 | | | 75–53 |
| 8 Jan | 15:00 | Poland | 0–3 | Bulgaria | 19–25 | 19–25 | 18–25 | | | 56–75 |
| 8 Jan | 20:00 | Germany | 0–3 | Russia | 23–25 | 17–25 | 28–30 | | | 68–80 |

==== Pool B ====
| Pos | Team | Pld | W | L | Pts | SW | SL | SR | SPW | SPL | SPR | Qualification |
|---|---|---|---|---|---|---|---|---|---|---|---|---|
| 1 | Netherlands | 3 | 3 | 0 | 6 | 9 | 0 | MAX | 225 | 172 | 1.308 | Semifinals |
| 2 | France | 3 | 2 | 1 | 5 | 6 | 4 | 1.500 | 248 | 233 | 1.064 | Semifinals |
| 3 | Spain | 3 | 1 | 2 | 4 | 4 | 8 | 0.500 | 241 | 287 | 0.840 | |
| 4 | Finland | 3 | 0 | 3 | 3 | 2 | 9 | 0.222 | 231 | 253 | 0.913 | |

| Date | Time | | Score | | Set 1 | Set 2 | Set 3 | Set 4 | Set 5 | Total |
|---|---|---|---|---|---|---|---|---|---|---|
| 5 Jan | 15:00 | Spain | 1–3 | France | 21–25 | 37–35 | 16–25 | 19–25 | | 93–110 |
| 5 Jan | 20:00 | Netherlands | 3–0 | Finland | 25–22 | 25–23 | 25–19 | | | 75–64 |
| 6 Jan | 17:30 | Finland | 2–3 | Spain | 19–25 | 25–22 | 25–15 | 23–25 | 10–15 | 102–102 |
| 7 Jan | 15:00 | France | 3–0 | Finland | 25–20 | 26–24 | 25–21 | | | 76–65 |
| 7 Jan | 20:00 | Spain | 0–3 | Netherlands | 20–25 | 14–25 | 12–25 | | | 46–75 |
| 8 Jan | 17:30 | France | 0–3 | Netherlands | 21–25 | 18–25 | 23–25 | | | 62–75 |

=== Final round ===
Semifinals
9 January
Russia | 3
France | 0
9 January
Netherlands | 3
Germany | 0

Final
10 January
Russia | 3
Netherlands | 0

==== Semifinals ====
| Date | Time | | Score | | Set 1 | Set 2 | Set 3 | Set 4 | Set 5 | Total |
|---|---|---|---|---|---|---|---|---|---|---|
| 9 Jan | 17:30 | Russia | 3–0 | France | 25–23 | 25–16 | 25–23 | | | 75–62 |
| 9 Jan | 20:00 | Netherlands | 3–0 | Germany | 25–21 | 25–23 | 25–17 | | | 75–61 |

==== Final ====
| Date | Time | | Score | | Set 1 | Set 2 | Set 3 | Set 4 | Set 5 | Total |
|---|---|---|---|---|---|---|---|---|---|---|
| 10 Jan | 15:30 | Russia | 3–0 | Netherlands | 25–19 | 25–17 | 25–16 | | | 75–52 |

=== Final standing ===
| Rank | Team |
|---|---|
| 1 | Russia |
| 2 | Netherlands |
| 3 | France |
| 3 | Germany |
| 5 | Bulgaria |
| 5 | Spain |
| 7 | Finland |
| 7 | Poland |

| Qualified for the 2004 Summer Olympics |
