= Stelian Moculescu =

Romanian volleyball player

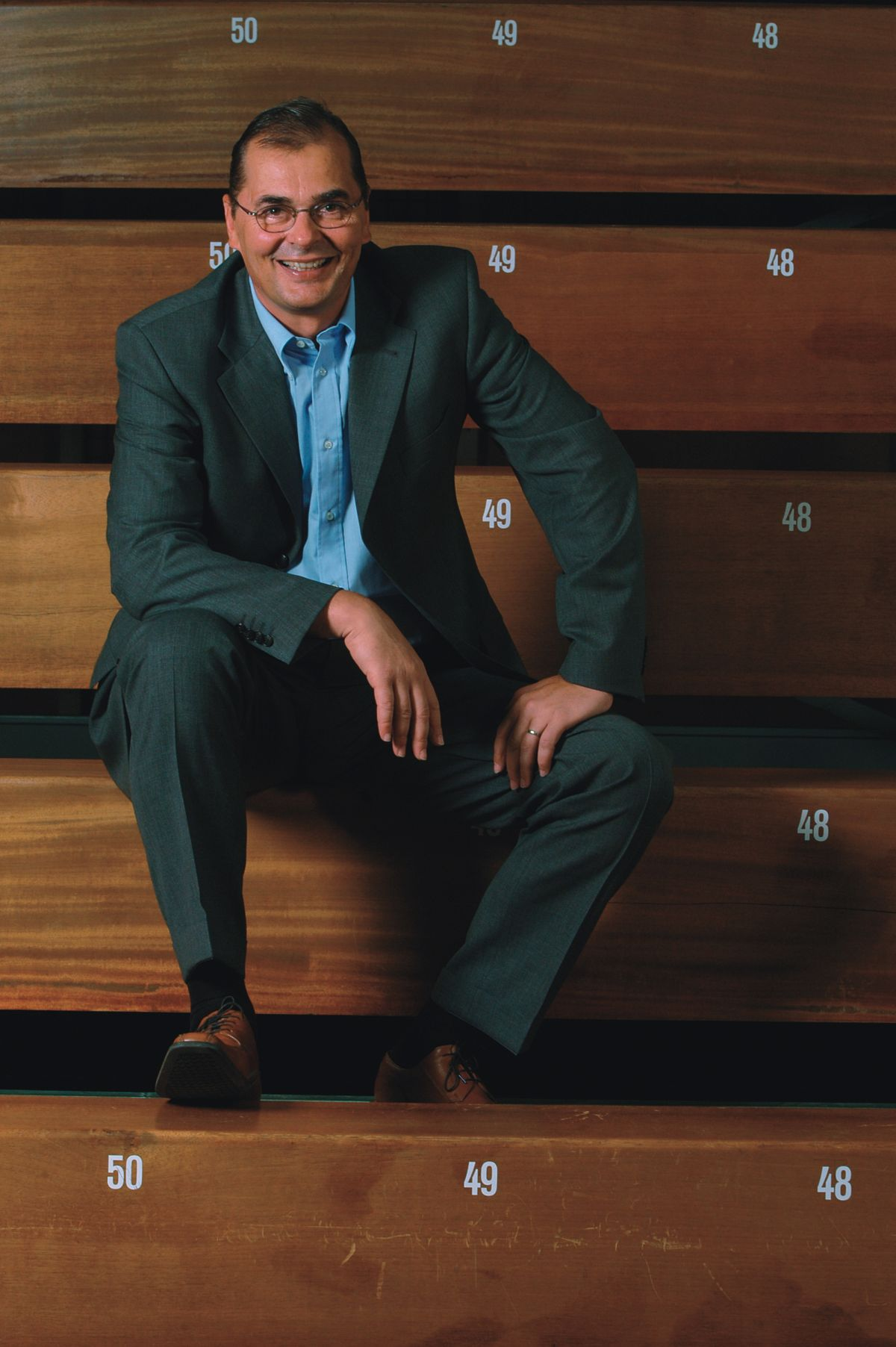
- Moculescu in 2006

Personal information
- Full name: Stelian Moculescu
- Nickname: Stelu
- Nationality: Romanian / German
- Born: 6 May 1950 (age 76); Brașov, Romania
- Height: 1.93 m (6 ft 4 in)

Coaching information
Previous teams coached
Years	Teams
1977–1980; 1981–1983; 1983–1985; 1985–1986; 1986–1989; 1987–1990; 1990–1991; 1991–1997; 1997–2016; 1999–2008; 2008–2012; 2017–2018; 2018; 2023–2024	TSV 1860 Munich; VC Passau; Tyrolia Vienna; Bayern; TSV 1860 Munich; West Germany; TSV Milbertshofen; ASV Dachau; VfB Friedrichshafen; Germany; Romania; Austria; Berlin Recycling; Dinamo București

Career
Years	Teams
1967–1970; 1970–1972; 1972–1973; 1973–1980; 1980–1981; 1981–1983	(Romania) CSŞ Timișoara (Romania) Rapid Bucharest (West Germany) USC Münster (West Germany) TSV 1860 Munich (Austria) Tyrolia Vienna (West Germany) VC Passau

National team
Romania; West Germany

Stelian Moculescu (born 6 May 1950 in Brașov) is a Romanian-German volleyball coach and former player. From 1987 to 1990 and from 1999 to 2008 he was also the coach of the Germany men's national volleyball team and the Romania men's national volleyball team. He is widely considered one of the greatest coaches in the history of this sport and a living legend.

He was awarded the Volleyball-Award in 2007 by the German Volleyball Association for his services to the sport.

== Honours ==
- CEV Champions League:
  - Winner (1): 2006-07
  - Runner-up (2): 1995–96, 1999–2000
  - Third (1): 1998–99
- German League:
  - Winner (20): 1975, 1978, 1980, 1991, 1995, 1996, 1998, 1999, 2000, 2001, 2002, 2005, 2006, 2007, 2008, 2009, 2010, 2011, 2015, 2018
- German Cup:
  - Winner (21): 1973, 1975, 1978, 1979, 1980, 1982, 1990, 1997, 1998, 1999, 2001, 2002, 2003, 2004, 2005, 2006, 2007, 2008, 2012, 2014, 2015
- Austrian League:
  - Winner (3): 1981, 1984, 1985
- Austrian Cup:
  - Winner (2): 1983, 1984

== Awards and recognition ==
- CEV Coach of the Year (2007)
- Order of Merit of Baden-Württemberg (2008)
