= Massimo Botti =

Italian volleyball player and coach

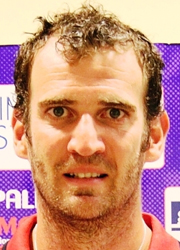
- Massimo Botti, 2011

Personal information
- Born: 23 May 1973 (age 53); Piacenza, Italy
- Height: 1.96 m (6 ft 5 in)

Coaching information
- Current team: Germany
Previous teams coached
Years	Teams
2016–2018; 2018–2019; 2019–2023; 2023; 2023–2025; 2025–2026; 2026–	Canottieri Ongina; Gas Sales Piacenza; Gas Sales Piacenza (AC); Gas Sales Piacenza; LUK Lublin; Asseco Resovia; Germany

Volleyball information
- Position: Middle blocker

Career
Years	Teams
1990–1995; 1995–2002; 2002–2005; 2005–2006; 2006; 2006–2007; 2007–2008; 2008–2010; 2010–2011; 2011–2012; 2012–2016	Pallavolo Parma; Volley Forlì; Volley Piacenza; Pallavolo Padova; Volley Taviano; Volley Piacenza; Marmi Lanza Verona; Umbria Volley; Volley Cavriago; Pallavolo Molfetta; Canottieri Ongina

National team
Italy (2)

Massimo Botti (born 25 May 1973) is an Italian professional volleyball coach and former player. He serves as head coach for the Germany national team.

== Honours ==
=== As a player ===
- CEV European Champions Cup
  - 1990–91 – with Maxicono Parma
  - 1992–93 – with Maxicono Parma
  - 1993–94 – with Maxicono Parma
- CEV Challenge Cup
  - 1991–92 – with Maxicono Parma
  - 1994–95 – with Maxicono Parma
  - 2003–04 – with Coprasystel Ventaglio Piacenza
  - 2006–07 – with Copra Berni Piacenza
  - 2009–10 – with Umbria Volley
- Domestic
  - 1991–92 Italian Cup, with Maxicono Parma
  - 1991–92 Italian Championship, with Maxicono Parma
  - 1992–93 Italian Championship, with Maxicono Parma
- Youth national team
  - 1992 CEV U20 European Championship
  - 1993 FIVB U21 World Championship

=== As a coach ===
- CEV Challenge Cup
  - 2024–25 – with Bogdanka LUK Lublin
- Domestic
  - 2022–23 Italian Cup, with Gas Sales Bluenergy Piacenza
  - 2024–25 Polish Championship, with Bogdanka LUK Lublin
