= List of FIVB Men's Volleyball World Championship qualifications =

The FIVB Men's Volleyball World Championship qualification is the process that a national men's volleyball team goes through to qualify for the FIVB Men's Volleyball World Championship finals.

Qualifying tournaments are held within the five FIVB continental zones (Africa, Asia and Oceania, Europe, North and Central America and Caribbean, South America), and are organized by their respective confederations. For each tournament, FIVB decides beforehand the number of places in the finals allocated to each of the continental zones, based on the numbers or relative strength of the confederations' teams.

== History ==
=== Summary ===
Allocations of FIVB Men's Volleyball World Championship
Allocation	1949 (Czechoslovakia) (10)	1952 (Soviet Union) (11)	1956 (France) (24)	1960 (Brazil) (14)	1962 (Soviet Union) (21)	1966 (Czechoslovakia) (22)	1970 (Bulgaria) (24)	1974 (Mexico) (24)	1978 (Italy) (24)	1982 (Argentina) (24)	1986 (France) (16)	1990 (Brazil) (16)	1994 (Greece) (16)	1998 (Japan) (24)	2002 (Argentina) (24)	2006 (Japan) (24)	2010 (Italy) (24)	2014 (Poland) (24)	2018 (Italy) (Bulgaria) (24)	2022 (Poland) (Slovenia) (24)	2025 (Philippines) (32)
Africa							2	2	2	2	1	1	1	2	2	2	3	3	3	3	3
Asia and Oceania						1	3	2	2	2	1	1	3	5	4	5	4	4	4	4	3
Europe						5	8	3	3	3	1	1	1	11	10	9	8	8	10	8	3
North, Central America and Caribbean						2	2	6	2	2	1	1		3	3	4	5	5	5	5	3
South America							2	2	2	2	1	1	1	2	2	2	2	3	2	2	3
Host nation(s)	1	1	1	1	1	1	1	1	1	1	1	1	1	1	1	1	1	1	2	2	1
Defending champions															1	1	1		1	1	1
World Championship						11	6	8	12	12	7	7	2								
World Qualifiers											3	3	6								
Olympic champions													1								
Wild cards	9	10	23	13	20	2														1	
World ranking																					15

==== Graphical ====
- Africa
- Asia and Oceania
- Europe
- North, Central America and Caribbean
- South America
- H; host

Tournament	H	2	3	4	5	6	7	8	9	10	11	12	13	14	15	16	17	18	19	20	21	22	23	24	25	26	27	28	29	30	31	32
(Czechoslovakia) 1949		9																														
(Soviet Union) 1952		2		8																												
(France) 1956		3			17																	2		1								
(Brazil) 1960		1	6						1	5																						
(Soviet Union) 1962		1	4				14														1											
(Czechoslovakia) 1966		3			15															2		1										
(Bulgaria) 1970		2		4				13													2		2									
(Mexico) 1974		2		3			10										6						2									
(Italy) 1978		2		3			11											4				3										
(Argentina) 1982		2		5					9									4				3										
(France) 1986		1	3			6						2		3																		
(Brazil) 1990		1	2		7							3			2																	
(Greece) 1994		1	3			6						3			2																	
(Japan) 1998		2		5					11											3			2									
(Argentina) 2002		2		5					11											3			2									
(Japan) 2006		2		5					9									4				3										
(Italy) 2010		3			4				8								5					3										
(Poland) 2014		3			4				8								5					3										
(Italy) (Bulgaria) 2018			3			4				8								5					2									
(Poland) (Slovenia) 2022			3			4				8								5					2									
(Philippines) 2025		4				5					15															3			4			

=== Qualification competition used ===
Competition	1949 (Czechoslovakia) (10)	1952 (Soviet Union) (11)	1956 (France) (24)	1960 (Brazil) (14)	1962 (Soviet Union) (21)	1966 (Czechoslovakia) (22)	1970 (Bulgaria) (24)	1974 (Mexico) (24)	1978 (Italy) (24)	1982 (Argentina) (24)	1986 (France) (16)	1990 (Brazil) (16)	1994 (Greece) (16)	1998 (Japan) (24)	2002 (Argentina) (24)	2006 (Japan) (24)	2010 (Italy) (24)	2014 (Poland) (24)	2018 (Italy) (Bulgaria) (24)	2022 (Poland) (Slovenia) (24)	2025 (Philippines) (32)
Summer Olympics	—	—	—	—	—	No	No	No	No	No	No	No	Yes	No	No	No	No	No	No	No	No
World Championship	—	No	No	No	No	Yes	Yes	Yes	Yes	Yes	Yes	Yes	Yes	No	Yes	Yes	Yes	No	Yes	Yes	Yes
African Championship	—	—	—	—	—	—	Yes	Yes	Yes	Yes	Yes	Yes	Yes	No	Yes	Yes	Yes	No	Yes	Yes	Yes
Asian Championship	—	—	—	—	—	—	—	—	No	Yes	No	Yes	Yes	No	No	No	No	No	No	Yes	Yes
European Championship	No	No	No	No	No	Yes	Yes	Yes	Yes	Yes	Yes	Yes	Yes	No	No	No	No	Yes	No	Yes	Yes
NORCECA Championship	—	—	—	—	—	—	Yes	Yes	Yes	Yes	Yes	Yes	No	No	No	No	No	No	Yes	Yes	Yes
South American Championship	—	No	No	No	No	No	Yes	Yes	Yes	Yes	Yes	Yes	No	No	No	No	No	Yes	Yes	Yes	Yes

=== Participation ===
These are the number of teams that participated in all levels of qualification for the World Championship since 1998:

Year	Teams entered					
Year	Africa	Asia and Oceania	Europe	NORCECA	South America	Total
1998	6	10+1	28	7	4	55+1
2002	8	12	28+1	10	3+1	61+2
2006	13	19+1	35	20	7+1	94+2
2010	13	21	34+1	33	8+1	109+2
2014	33	28	43+1	39	6	149+1
2018	21	20	39+3	39	8	127+3

== Current format ==
Confederation	Slots
CAVB (Africa)	3
AVC (Asia and Oceania)	3
CEV (Europe)	3
NORCECA (North America)	3
CSV (South America)	3
World ranked non-qualified teams	15
Total	32 (30+H+C)

== First appearance in qualification (1998–2022) ==
Note: Only teams that played at least one match are considered for the purposes of first appearance. Teams that withdrew prior to the qualification, or that qualified to the World Championship by walkover due to other teams' withdrawals, are not considered.

Edition	Africa	Asia and Oceania	Europe	North, Central America and Caribbean	South America	Total
(Japan) 1998	Algeria; Cameroon; Egypt; Kenya; Nigeria; Tunisia	Australia; China; Chinese Taipei; Indonesia; Iran; Kazakhstan; Saudi Arabia; South Korea; Thailand; Uzbekistan	Austria; Belarus; Belgium; Bosnia and Herzegovina; Bulgaria; Croatia; Czech Republic; Denmark; Estonia; Finland; France; Germany; Greece; Hungary; Israel; Italy; Latvia; Netherlands; Poland; Portugal; Romania; Russia; Slovakia; Spain; Sweden; Turkey; Ukraine; Yugoslavia	Barbados; Canada; Cuba; Haiti; Mexico; Puerto Rico; United States	Argentina; Brazil; Peru; Venezuela	55
(Argentina) 2002	Namibia; Morocco	India; Japan; Qatar	Andorra; Norway; Slovenia	Aruba; Dominican Republic; Jamaica; Netherlands Antilles	Chile	13
(Japan) 2006	Botswana; DR Congo; Eritrea; Ghana; Mauritius; South Africa; Sudan; Uganda	Afghanistan; Jordan; Macau; Maldives; Oman; Philippines; Tonga	Albania; Azerbaijan; England; Northern Ireland; Scotland; Serbia and Montenegro	Anguilla; British Virgin Islands; Cayman Islands; Costa Rica; Dominica; Guatemala; Honduras; Nicaragua; Panama; Saint Kitts and Nevis; Saint Lucia; Trinidad and Tobago	Colombia; Ecuador; Paraguay; Uruguay	37
(Italy) 2010	Malawi; Mozambique; Zimbabwe	Bangladesh; Fiji; New Zealand; Pakistan; Samoa	Great Britain; Montenegro; Serbia	Antigua and Barbuda; Bahamas; Belize; Bermuda; El Salvador; Grenada; Montserrat; Saint Vincent and the Grenadines; Suriname; U.S. Virgin Islands	Bolivia	22
(Poland) 2014	Burkina Faso; Burundi; Cape Verde; Chad; Congo; Gabon; Ivory Coast; Lesotho; Libya; Niger; Rwanda; Senegal; Seychelles; Sierra Leone; Eswatini; Tanzania; Togo; Zambia	Bahrain; Hong Kong; Kuwait; Lebanon; Sri Lanka; Syria; United Arab Emirates; Vietnam	Cyprus; Iceland; Luxembourg; North Macedonia; San Marino; Switzerland	Curaçao; Guadeloupe; Martinique; Saint Martin; Sint Eustatius; Sint Maarten; Turks and Caicos Islands	—	39
(Italy) (Bulgaria) 2018	—	Kyrgyzstan; Myanmar	Andorra; Georgia; Kosovo	—	—	5
(Poland) (Slovenia) 2022	—	—	—	—	—	0
(Philippines) 2025	—	—	—	—	—	0

== See also ==
- National team appearances in the FIVB Men's Volleyball World Championship
- FIVB Men's Volleyball World Championship Qualification (AVC)
- List of FIVB Volleyball Women's World Championship qualifications
