= FIVB Men's Volleyball World Championship Qualification (AVC) =

- Sport: Volleyball
- Founded: 1974
- Folded: 2018
- No. of teams: Various
- Continent: Asia and Oceania (AVC)

The FIVB Men's Volleyball World Championship Qualification (AVC) was a volleyball qualification tournament for the FIVB Men's Volleyball World Championship. Contested by the senior men's national teams of the members of the Asian Volleyball Confederation (AVC).

== Results summary ==
=== First format (1974–1994*) ===
Year	Host	Qualified Teams		Teams
Year	Host	Winners	Runners-up	Teams
1974	(Philippines); Manila	South Korea	Taiwan (Note: People's Republic of China replaced Republic of China (Asian Qualification Runners-up) after FIVB recognised China as a legitimate Chinese state.)	5
1978	(British Hong Kong); Hong Kong	South Korea	China	4
1986	(Australia); Sydney	Chinese Taipei	—N/a	4
1994	(Australia); Sydney	Japan	China	5

* Not held in 1982 and 1990.

=== Second format (1998–2018) ===
==== Final round ====
Year	Qualified Teams				Teams
Year	First pool	Second pool	Third pool	Fourth pool	Teams
1998	(Saudi Arabia) Jeddah	(Iran) Tehran	(Uzbekistan) Tashkent	—	10
1998	South Korea Thailand	China Iran	Australia	—	10
2002	(Kazakhstan) Almaty	(Qatar) Doha	Macau	—	12
2002	South Korea (Note: South Korea Withdrew after qualifying.) Kazakhstan	Japan	China Australia	—	12
2006	(Kazakhstan) Almaty	(India) Chennai	(Iran) Tehran	(India) Chennai	12
2006	Kazakhstan	China	Iran	South Korea Australia	12
2010	(China) Chengdu	(Japan) Komaki	—		8
2010	China Australia	Japan Iran	—		8
2014	(Australia) Canberra	(Iran) Tehran	(China) Chenzhou	(Japan) Komaki	16
2014	Australia	Iran	China	South Korea	16
2018	(Iran) Ardabil	(Australia) Canberra	—		10
2018	Iran China	Japan Australia	—		10

== All qualified teams ==
- Note: No qualifications – free entrance from 1949 to 1962.

Year	Asian nations in FIVB Men's Volleyball World Championship (How to Qualify)						Teams (Note: In Asian qualification tournament)
Year	First team	Second team	Third team	Fourth team	Fifth team	Sixth team	Teams
1952	India	Lebanon					–
1956	China	India	South Korea				–
1960	~~India~~ (Note: India withdrew.)	Japan					–
1962	China	~~India~~	Japan	Mongolia	North Korea		–
1966	Japan (1962 World 5th Place)	China (1962 World 9th Place)	Mongolia (Unknown)	~~North Korea~~; ~~(Unknown)~~ (Note: North Korea withdrew.)			–
1970	Japan (1966 World 5th Place)	Mongolia (Replacement) (Note: Mongolia replaced South Korea (1966 Asian Games Runners-up) because of South Korea did not play due to political problems with Bulgaria.)	Iran (1966 Asian Games 3rd Place)	North Korea (Replacement) (Note: North Korea replaced India (1966 Asian Games 4th place) who withdrew.)			–
1974; Details	Japan (1970 World 3rd Place)	South Korea (winners)	China (Replacement)				5
1978; Details	Japan (1974 World 3rd Place)	South Korea (winners)	China (runners-up)				4
1982	South Korea (1978 World 4th Place)	China (1978 World 7th Place)	Japan (1978 World 11th Place)	Australia (1979 Asian 4th Place	Iraq (Replacement) (Note: Iraq replaced India.)		–
1986; Details	Japan (1982 World 4th Place)	China (1982 World 7th Place)	Chinese Taipei (winners)				4
1990	South Korea (1989 Asian Champions)	Japan (World Qualification 3rd Place)					–
1994; Details	South Korea (1993 Asian Champions)	China (winners)	Japan (runners-up)				5
1998; Details	Japan (Host Country)	South Korea (Pool C Winners)	China (Pool D Winners)	Australia (Pool E Winners)	Thailand (Pool C Runners-up)	Iran (Pool D Runners-up)	10
2002; Details	~~South Korea~~; ~~(Pool C Winners)~~	Japan (Pool D Winners)	China (Pool E Winners)	Kazakhstan (Pool C Runners-up)	Australia (Pool E Runners-up)		12
2006; Details	Japan (Host Country)	Kazakhstan (Pool D Winners)	China (Pool E Winners)	Iran (Pool F Winners)	South Korea (Play-off Winners)	Australia (Play-off Runners-up)	19
2010; Details	China (Pool G Winners)	Japan (Pool H Winners)	Australia (Pool G Runners-up)	Iran (Pool H Runners-up)			21
2014; Details	Australia (Pool A Winners)	Iran (Pool B Winners)	China (Pool C Winners)	South Korea (Pool D Winners)			28
2018; Details	Iran (Pool A Winners)	Japan (Pool B Winners)	China (Pool A Runners-up)	Australia (Pool B Runners-up)			20
2022	Iran (2021 Asian Champions)	Japan (2021 Asian Runners-up)	Qatar (World Rankings)	China (World Rankings)			–
2025	Philippines (Host Country)	Japan (2023 Asian Champions)	Iran (2023 Asian Runners-up)	Qatar (2023 Asian Third place)	China (World Rankings)	South Korea (World Rankings)	–
2027	Japan (2026 Asian Champions)	Iran (2026 Asian Runners-up)	South Korea (2026 Asian Third place)				–
