= 2025 FIVB Men's Volleyball World Championship qualification =

- Dates: 3 August 2022 – 30 August 2024
- Teams: 80 (from 5 confederations)

The 2025 FIVB Men's Volleyball World Championship was the first edition that featured 32 teams. The first two spots were allocated to the current titleholder, Italy, and the host, Philippines. As the FIVB has 5 continental federations, three spots were reserved for the top three of each continental championship held in 2023, which total 15 places. Remaining places were allocated to the top 15 teams in the FIVB World Ranking at the end of the 2024 national team season that have not yet qualified through the first three criteria.

== Qualification summary ==
=== Qualified teams ===
Country	Confederation	Method of qualification	Date of qualification	Appearance(s)			Previous best performance
Country	Confederation	Method of qualification	Date of qualification	Total	First	Last	Previous best performance
Philippines	AVC	Hosts	20 March 2024	1	Debut		—N/a
Italy	CEV	Defending champions	11 September 2022	19	1949	2022	Champions (1990, 1994, 1998, 2022)
Japan	AVC	2023 Asian champions	25 August 2023	17	1960	2022	3rd place (1970, 1974)
Iran	AVC	2023 Asian runners-up	25 August 2023	8	1970	2022	6th place (2014)
Qatar	AVC	2023 Asian 3rd placers	26 August 2023	2	2022	2022	21st place (2022)
Brazil	CSV	2023 South American runners-up	28 August 2023	19	1956	2022	Champions (2002, 2006, 2010)
Argentina	CSV	2023 South American champions	29 August 2023	14	1960	2022	3rd place (1982)
Colombia	CSV	2023 South American 3rd placers	29 August 2023	1	Debut		—N/a
United States	NORCECA	2023 NORCECA champions	9 September 2023	18	1956	2022	Champions (1986)
Canada	NORCECA	2023 NORCECA runners-up	9 September 2023	13	1974	2022	7th place (2014)
Cuba	NORCECA	2023 NORCECA 3rd placers	10 September 2023	17	1956	2022	Runners-up (1990, 2010)
Egypt	CAVB	2023 African champions	11 September 2023	11	1974	2022	13th place (2010)
Algeria	CAVB	2023 African runners-up	11 September 2023	3	1994	1998	13th place (1994)
Poland	CEV	2023 European champions	12 September 2023	19	1949	2022	Champions (1974, 2014, 2018)
Slovenia	CEV	2023 European 3rd placers	12 September 2023	3	2018	2022	4th place (2022)
France	CEV	2023 European 4th placers^{a}	12 September 2023	18	1949	2022	3rd place (2002)
Libya	CAVB	2023 African 3rd placers	13 September 2023	2	1982	1982	24th place (1982)
Germany	CEV	1st World ranked non-qualified team	30 August 2024	13^{b}	1956	2022	Champions (1970)
Serbia	CEV	2nd World ranked non-qualified team	30 August 2024	12^{c}	1956	2022	Runners-up (1998)
Netherlands	CEV	3rd World ranked non-qualified team	30 August 2024	14	1949	2022	Runners-up (1994)
Ukraine	CEV	4th World ranked non-qualified team	30 August 2024	3	1998	2022	7th place (2022)
Belgium	CEV	5th World ranked non-qualified team	30 August 2024	10	1949	2018	8th place (1970)
Turkey	CEV	6th World ranked non-qualified team	30 August 2024	5	1956	2022	11th place (2022)
Czech Republic	CEV	7th World ranked non-qualified team	30 August 2024	17^{d}	1949	2010	Champions (1956, 1966)
Bulgaria	CEV	8th World ranked non-qualified team	30 August 2024	20	1949	2022	Runners-up (1970)
Portugal	CEV	9th World ranked non-qualified team	30 August 2024	3	1956	2002	8th place (2002)
Finland	CEV	10th World ranked non-qualified team	30 August 2024	9	1952	2018	9th place (2014)
Tunisia	CAVB	11th World ranked non-qualified team	30 August 2024	12	1962	2022	15th place (2006)
China	AVC	12th World ranked non-qualified team	30 August 2024	16	1956	2022	7th place (1978, 1982)
Romania	CEV	13th World ranked non-qualified team	30 August 2024	11	1949	1982	Runners-up (1956, 1966)
Chile	CSV	14th World ranked non-qualified team	30 August 2024	2	1982	1982	23rd place (1982)
South Korea	AVC	15th World ranked non-qualified team	30 August 2024	10	1956	2014	4th place (1978)

Notes
^{a} France, 4th placers of the tournament qualified since Italy, the runners-up of this tournament were the defending world champions.
^{b} Competed as East Germany from 1956 to 1990 (7 times) and as West Germany from 1956 to 1990 (8 times); 5 appearances as Germany.
^{c} Competed as SFR Yugoslavia from 1956 to 1970 (4 times) and as Serbia and Montenegro from 1998 to 2006 (3 times); 4 appearances as Serbia.
^{d} Competed as Czechoslovakia from 1949 to 1990; 5 appearances as Czech Republic.

=== Qualification process ===
There were two methods to qualify for the 2025 FIVB Men's Volleyball World Championship: a direct qualification through the 2023 Continental Championships and a qualification based on the FIVB World Ranking at the end of August 2024. The Continental Championships took place between August and September 2023. The qualification process commenced on 3 August 2022, initially with the qualifiers for the 2023 European Championship. In contrast, four other Continental Championships did not implement a qualification process. The Continental Championships took place between August and September 2023.

=== Timelines ===
The following five Continental Championships held to select and qualify teams for the tournament:

Confederation	Tournament		Date	Venue	Teams
AVC (Asia and Oceania)	2023 Asian Championship		19–26 August 2023	(Iran) Urmia	17
CAVB (Africa)	2023 African Championship		3–13 September 2023	(Egypt) Cairo	15
CEV (Europe)	2023 European Championship qualification	Pool A	3–20 August 2022	(Azerbaijan) Baku, (Denmark) Middelfart and (Turkey) Istanbul	3
CEV (Europe)	2023 European Championship qualification	Pool B	3–21 August 2022	(Austria) Ried im Innkreis, (Finland) Tampere and (Latvia) Valmiera	3
CEV (Europe)	2023 European Championship qualification	Pool C	3–21 August 2022	(Belgium) Beveren, (Estonia) Tallinn and (Faroe Islands) Tórshavn	3
CEV (Europe)	2023 European Championship qualification	Pool D	3–21 August 2022	(Iceland) Kópavogur, Luxembourg City, (Montenegro) Kolašin and (Portugal) Póvoa de Varzim	4
CEV (Europe)	2023 European Championship qualification	Pool E	3–21 August 2022	(Croatia) Osijek, (Cyprus) Nicosia, (Greece) Glyfada and (Norway) Volda	4
CEV (Europe)	2023 European Championship qualification	Pool F	3–21 August 2022	(Georgia (country)) Tbilisi, (Hungary) Budapest, (Slovakia) Nitra and (Spain) Teruel	4
CEV (Europe)	2023 European Championship qualification	Pool G	3–21 August 2022	(Albania) Tirana, (Bosnia and Herzegovina) Tuzla, (Romania) Galați and (Switzerland) Schönenwerd	4
CEV (Europe)	2023 European Championship		28 August – 16 September 2023	Italy, Bulgaria, North Macedonia and Israel	23+1
CSV (South America)	2023 South American Championship		26–30 August 2023	(Brazil) Recife	5
NORCECA (North America)	2023 NORCECA Championship		5–10 September 2023	(United States) Charleston, West Virginia	7
Total	5 Continental Championship		3 August 2022 – 16 September 2023		92+1

=== Entries ===
FIVB's 222 national federations, 80 men's national teams entered or qualified for the Continental Championships in 2023, while Russia and Belarus were banned due to suspension from CEV and FIVB competitions following their country's invasion of Ukraine. For Europe, 25 additional teams entered the qualifiers of their Continental Championship. The other 13 teams were listed in the FIVB World Ranking at the end of August 2024, but were not compete in their Continental Championships.

The entries, listed by confederation:

AVC (17 entries)

- Afghanistan
- Bahrain
- Bangladesh
- China
- Chinese Taipei
- Hong Kong
- India
- Indonesia
- Iran
- Iraq
- Japan
- Kazakhstan
- Pakistan
- Philippines
- Qatar
- South Korea
- Thailand
- Uzbekistan

CAVB (15 entries)

- Algeria
- Burundi
- Cameroon
- Chad
- Egypt
- Gambia
- Ghana
- Kenya
- Libya
- Mali
- Morocco
- Rwanda
- Senegal
- Tanzania
- Tunisia

CEV (36 entries)

- Albania
- Azerbaijan
- Austria
- Belgium
- Bosnia and Herzegovina
- Bulgaria
- Croatia
- Cyprus
- Czech Republic
- Denmark
- Estonia
- Finland
- France
- Faroe Islands
- Germany
- Greece
- Georgia
- Hungary
- Iceland
- Israel
- Italy
- Latvia
- Luxembourg
- Montenegro
- Netherlands
- Norway
- Poland
- Portugal
- Romania
- Serbia
- Slovakia
- Slovenia
- Spain
- Switzerland
- Turkey
- Ukraine

CSV (5 entries)

- Argentina
- Brazil
- Chile
- Colombia
- Peru

NORCECA (7 entries)

- Canada
- Cuba
- Dominican Republic
- Mexico
- Puerto Rico
- Suriname
- United States

== Host country ==
FIVB reserved a berth for the 2025 FIVB Men's Volleyball World Championship host country to participate in the tournament.

On 20 March 2024, FIVB announced that the Philippines would host the 2025 FIVB Men's Volleyball World Championship. The Philippines did not take part at the 2023 Asian Men's Volleyball Championship.

== Defending champions ==
FIVB reserved a berth for the 2022 FIVB Men's Volleyball World Championship champions to participate in the tournament.

- Italy from CEV (Europe)

== Continental championships ==
=== AVC (Asia and Oceania) ===
Final standing

Qualified for 2025 World Championship

Rank	Team
1st place, gold medalist(s)	Japan
2nd place, silver medalist(s)	Iran
3rd place, bronze medalist(s)	Qatar
4	China
5	South Korea
6	Chinese Taipei
7	Pakistan
8	Bahrain
9	Indonesia
10	Thailand
11	India
12	Iraq
13	Kazakhstan
14	Afghanistan
15	Bangladesh
16	Hong Kong
17	Uzbekistan

=== CAVB (Africa) ===
Final standing

Qualified for 2025 World Championship

Rank	Team
1st place, gold medalist(s)	Egypt
2nd place, silver medalist(s)	Algeria
3rd place, bronze medalist(s)	Libya
4	Cameroon
5	Tunisia
6	Rwanda
7	Chad
8	Morocco
9	Kenya
10	Ghana
11	Senegal
12	Gambia
13	Tanzania
14	Burundi
15	Mali

=== CEV (Europe) ===
Final standing

Qualified for 2025 World Championship

Rank	Team
1st place, gold medalist(s)	Poland
2nd place, silver medalist(s)	Italy
3rd place, bronze medalist(s)	Slovenia
4	France
5	Netherlands
6	Serbia
7	Romania
8	Ukraine
9	Germany
10	Portugal
11	Croatia
12	Czech Republic
13	Turkey
14	Belgium
15	Bulgaria
16	North Macedonia
17	Spain
18	Israel
19	Montenegro
20	Estonia
21	Finland
22	Greece
23	Switzerland
24	Denmark

=== CSV (South America) ===
Final standing

Qualified for 2025 World Championship

Rank	Team
1st place, gold medalist(s)	Argentina
2nd place, silver medalist(s)	Brazil
3rd place, bronze medalist(s)	Colombia
4	Chile
5	Peru

=== NORCECA (North America) ===
Final standing

Qualified for 2025 World Championship

Rank	Team
1st place, gold medalist(s)	United States
2nd place, silver medalist(s)	Canada
3rd place, bronze medalist(s)	Cuba
4	Dominican Republic
5	Mexico
6	Puerto Rico
7	Suriname

== FIVB World Ranking ==
The final 15 places belonged to the top 15 teams as per FIVB World Ranking who had not yet qualified.

Top 30 rankings as of 30 August 2024

Qualified for the 2025 World Championship via continental championship
Qualified for the 2025 World Championship as defending champions
Qualified for the 2025 World Championship via FIVB World Ranking

Rank	Team	Points
1	Poland	401.31
2	France	378.07
3	United States	365.87
4	Slovenia	352.5
5	Italy	346.23
6	Japan	338.12
7	Brazil	305.87
8	Germany	274.38
9	Argentina	266.94
10	Serbia	259.28
11	Canada	254.46
12	Cuba	249.34
13	Netherlands	204.81
14	Ukraine	196
15	Iran	185.07
16	Belgium	183.24
17	Turkey	175.28
18	Czech Republic	168.95
19	Bulgaria	161.06
20	Egypt	156.94
21	Qatar	151.46
22	Portugal	147.16
23	Finland	146.72
24	Tunisia	145.09
25	China	144.02
26	Romania	143.07
27	Chile	139.14
28	South Korea	138.48
29	Croatia	136.4
30	Puerto Rico	135.23
