= Mongolia men's national volleyball team =

Mongolia
- Association: Mongolia Volleyball Federation
- Confederation: AVC
- Head coach: Pablo Del Crecco
- FIVB ranking: 132 ▼5 (3 August 2026)

Uniforms
Home	Away

World Championship
- Appearances: 3 (First in 1962)
- Best result: 16th (1970)
Honours
Eastern Asian Championship
Bronze medal – third place	2026 Ulaanbaatar	Team
CAVA Nations League
Bronze medal – third place	2023 Cholpon-Ata	Team

The Mongolia men's national volleyball team represents Mongolia in international volleyball competitions.

== Competition record ==
=== World Championship ===
- (Soviet Union) 1962 – 17th place
- (Czechoslovakia) 1966 – 21st place
- (Bulgaria) 1970 – 16th place
- (Mexico) 1974 did not qualify
- (Italy) 1978 did not qualify
- (Argentina) 1982 did not qualify
- (France) 1986 did not qualify
- (Brazil) 1990 did not qualify
- (Greece) 1994 did not qualify
- (Japan) 1998 did not qualify
- (Argentina) 2002 did not qualify
- (Japan) 2006 did not qualify
- (Italy) 2010 did not qualify
- (Poland) 2014 did not qualify
- (Italy) (Bulgaria) 2018 did not qualify
- (Poland) (Slovenia) 2022 did not qualify
- (Philippines) 2025 did not qualify
- (Poland) 2027 did not qualify
- (Qatar) 2029 to be determined

=== Asian Games ===
- (Japan) 1994 – 7th place
- (Qatar) 2006 – 17th place
- (China) 2010 – 17th place
- (Indonesia) 2018 – 18th place
- (China) 2022 – 15th place
- (Japan) 2026 - did not enter

=== Asian Men' s Volleyball Championship ===
- (Iran) 2023 withdrew
- (Japan) 2026 did not qualify

=== Asian Nations Cup ===
- (Sri Lanka) 2018 – 8th place
- (Kyrgyzstan) 2022 – 4th place
- (Taiwan) 2023 – 8th place
- (Bahrain) 2024 – Did not enter
- (Bahrain) 2025 – Did not enter
- (India) 2026 – Did not enter

=== East Asian Championship ===
- (Macau) 1998 – 4th place
- (Mongolia) 2000 – 5th place
- (China) 2002 – 5th place
- (China) 2004 – 7th place
- (Taiwan) 2006 – Did not enter
- (Mongolia) 2008 – 6th place
- (South Korea) 2010 – 5th place
- (Taiwan) 2013 – Did not enter
- (Mongolia) 2015 – 4th place
- (Mongolia) 2017 – 4th place
- (China) 2019 – Did not enter
- (China) 2025 – 5th place
- (Mongolia) 2026 – (bronze) 3rd place

=== CAVA Nations League ===
- (Kyrgyzstan) 2023 – (bronze) 3rd place

== Fixture and results ==
=== 2018 ===
15 September; 13:30	United Arab Emirates	3–1	Mongolia	Sugathadasa Indoor Stadium, Colombo
15 September; 13:30	(31–29, 25–22, 20–25, 25–21); P2 Report			Sugathadasa Indoor Stadium, Colombo

16 September; 13:30	Mongolia	0–3	Iraq	Sugathadasa Indoor Stadium, Colombo
16 September; 13:30	(14–25, 20–25, 19–25); P2 Report			Sugathadasa Indoor Stadium, Colombo

17 September; 13:30	Bangladesh	3–1	Mongolia	Sugathadasa Indoor Stadium, Colombo
17 September; 13:30	(25–22, 25–23, 23–25, 25–19); P2 Report			Sugathadasa Indoor Stadium, Colombo

==== 5th–8th semifinals ====
20 September; 10:00	Mongolia	2–3	Hong Kong	Sugathadasa Indoor Stadium, Colombo
20 September; 10:00	(21–25, 25–20, 26–24, 17–25, 10–15); P2 Report			Sugathadasa Indoor Stadium, Colombo

=== 2018 ===
20 August 2018; 12:30 UTC+7	Pakistan	3–0	Mongolia	GBK Tennis Indoor, Jakarta; Attendance: 400; Referees: Khaled Al-Zughaibi (KSA), Joseph Gerard (MAS)
20 August 2018; 12:30 UTC+7	(25–16, 25–19, 25–14); Report			GBK Tennis Indoor, Jakarta; Attendance: 400; Referees: Khaled Al-Zughaibi (KSA), Joseph Gerard (MAS)

24 August 2018; 09:00 UTC+7	Mongolia	0–3	Iran	Bulungan Sport Hall, Jakarta; Attendance: 500; Referees: Nurbek Kalykov (KGZ), Ahmed Nasheed (MDV)
24 August 2018; 09:00 UTC+7	(18–25, 19–25, 20–25); Report			Bulungan Sport Hall, Jakarta; Attendance: 500; Referees: Nurbek Kalykov (KGZ), Ahmed Nasheed (MDV)

=== 2022 ===
Date	Time		Score		Set 1	Set 2	Set 3	Set 4	Set 5	Total	Report
29 Aug	18:15	Kyrgyzstan	0–3	Mongolia	21–25	25–27	14–25			60–77	Report

Date	Time		Score		Set 1	Set 2	Set 3	Set 4	Set 5	Total	Report
30 Aug	15:30	Mongolia	0–3	Saudi Arabia	22–25	11–25	21–25			54–75	Report

Date	Time		Score		Set 1	Set 2	Set 3	Set 4	Set 5	Total	Report
31 Aug	15:30	Uzbekistan	1–3	Mongolia	17–25	22–25	28–26	22–25		89–101	Report

=== 2023 ===
Date	Time	Venue		Score		Set 1	Set 2	Set 3	Set 4	Set 5	Total	Report
8 Jul	10:00	Court 2	Macau	0–3	Mongolia	14–25	20–25	19–25			53–75	Report

Date	Time	Venue		Score		Set 1	Set 2	Set 3	Set 4	Set 5	Total	Report
10 Jul	10:00	Court 2	Mongolia	2–3	Philippines	25–22	21–25	24–26	25–23	12–15	107–111	Report

=== 2023 ===
19 September 2023; 14:30 UTC+8	Pakistan	3–0	Mongolia	Linping Sports Centre Gymnasium, Hangzhou; Attendance: 535; Referees: Alireza Gharib
19 September 2023; 14:30 UTC+8	(25–17, 25–19, 25–20); P2 Report			Linping Sports Centre Gymnasium, Hangzhou; Attendance: 535; Referees: Alireza Gharib

21 September 2023; 19:00 UTC+8	Mongolia	0–3	Chinese Taipei	Linping Sports Centre Gymnasium, Hangzhou; Attendance: 1,663; Referees: Alireza Gharib
21 September 2023; 19:00 UTC+8	(22–25, 20–25, 21–25); P2 Report			Linping Sports Centre Gymnasium, Hangzhou; Attendance: 1,663; Referees: Alireza Gharib

== Team ==
The following is the Mongolia roster in the men's volleyball tournament of the 2018 Asian Games.

Head coach: Solongo Dorj

No.	Name	Date of birth	Height	Weight	Spike	Block	Club
1	Nyamsukh Sukhee	9 March 2000	1.81 m (5 ft 11 in)	70 kg (150 lb)	325 cm (128 in)	320 cm (130 in)	
2	Turmandakh Gankhuyag	19 August 1998	1.83 m (6 ft 0 in)	78 kg (172 lb)	305 cm (120 in)	300 cm (120 in)	(Mongolia) Hasu Megastars
3	Altangerel Enkhee	20 June 1995	1.92 m (6 ft 4 in)	87 kg (192 lb)	330 cm (130 in)	325 cm (128 in)	(Mongolia) Hasu Megastars
5	Buyanjargal Zolboot	17 May 1994	1.78 m (5 ft 10 in)	75 kg (165 lb)	290 cm (110 in)	285 cm (112 in)	(Mongolia) Hasu Megastars
7	Tserenbaatar Myagmarchimed	19 August 1998	1.78 m (5 ft 10 in)	75 kg (165 lb)	310 cm (120 in)	300 cm (120 in)	(Mongolia) Hasu Megastars
9	Munkhsaikahn Munkhbayar	10 December 1990	1.77 m (5 ft 10 in)	74 kg (163 lb)	290 cm (110 in)	285 cm (112 in)	(Mongolia) Hasu Megastars
10	Usukhbayar Turmandakh	20 October 2000	1.89 m (6 ft 2 in)	80 kg (180 lb)	325 cm (128 in)	320 cm (130 in)	
11	Batjargal Jargal	23 October 1995	1.87 m (6 ft 2 in)	80 kg (180 lb)	320 cm (130 in)	315 cm (124 in)	(Mongolia) Hasu Megastars
13	Bazargur Altantsag	9 June 1990	1.89 m (6 ft 2 in)	82 kg (181 lb)	325 cm (128 in)	320 cm (130 in)	(Mongolia) Hasu Megastars
15	Davaajargal Altankhuyag (c)	25 November 1991	1.84 m (6 ft 0 in)	82 kg (181 lb)	321 cm (126 in)	315 cm (124 in)	(Mongolia) Hasu Megastars
17	Munkh-Erdene Aduuch	21 February 1994	1.79 m (5 ft 10 in)	75 kg (165 lb)	300 cm (120 in)	295 cm (116 in)	(Mongolia) Hasu Megastars
18	Erdembileg Ganbat	9 June 1990	1.96 m (6 ft 5 in)	84 kg (185 lb)	330 cm (130 in)	320 cm (130 in)	(Mongolia) Uurkhaichin
