= Asian Eastern Zonal Men's Volleyball Championship =

International volleyball competition

- Most recent season or competition: 2026 Asian Eastern Zonal Men's Volleyball Championship
- Sport: Volleyball
- Founded: 1998; 28 years ago
- First season: 1998
- No. of teams: Various
- Continent: East Asia (AVC)
- Most recent champion: South Korea (4th title)
- Most titles: Japan (6 titles)
- Website: asianvolleyball.net

Asian Eastern Zonal Men's Volleyball Championship is a men's international volleyball competition in East Asia for member nations of the East Asian Zonal Volleyball Association (EAZVA). The first competition was contested in 1998 in Macau and have been played every two years until 2024. The current champion is South Korea, which won its fourth title at the 2026 tournament.

== Results summary ==
Year	Host	Final			Third place match			Teams
Year	Host	Champions	Score	Runners-up	3rd place	Score	4th place	Teams
1998; Details	Macau	Japan		South Korea	China		Mongolia	6
2000; Details	(Mongolia); Ulaanbaatar	Japan		South Korea	China		Hong Kong	6
2002; Details	(China); Shanghai	China		South Korea	Japan		Chinese Taipei	7
2004; Details	(China); Taicang	Japan		South Korea	Chinese Taipei		China	7
2006; Details	(Chinese Taipei); Pingtung	Japan	Round-robin	Chinese Taipei	South Korea	Round-robin	China	6
2008; Details	(Mongolia); Ulaanbaatar	South Korea		Chinese Taipei	Japan		China	7
2010; Details	(South Korea); Jeju	South Korea		Chinese Taipei	Japan		Hong Kong	6
2013; Details	(Chinese Taipei); Taipei	Chinese Taipei	3–0	South Korea	Japan	3–2	China	6
2015; Details	(Mongolia); Ulaanbaatar	Japan	3–0	Chinese Taipei	South Korea	3–0	Mongolia	8
2017; Details	(Mongolia); Ulaanbaatar	Japan	3–1	Chinese Taipei	South Korea	3–0	Mongolia	7
2019; Details	(China); Zhangjiagang	China	Round-robin	Chinese Taipei	North Korea	Round-robin	South Korea	6
2021	No tournament was held							
2024	No tournament was held							
2025; Details	(China); Zhangjiagang	South Korea	3–0	Chinese Taipei	China	3–1	Hong Kong	6
2026; Details	(Mongolia); Ulaanbaatar	South Korea	3–1	Japan	Mongolia	3–1	China	7

=== Teams reaching the top four ===
Team	Titles	Runners-up	Third place	Fourth place
Japan	6 (1998, 2000, 2004, 2006, 2015, 2017)	1 (2026)	4 (2002, 2008, 2010, 2004)	—
South Korea	4 (2008, 2010, 2025, 2026)	5 (1998, 2000, 2002, 2004, 2013)	3 (2006, 2015, 2017)	1 (2019)
China	2 (2002, 2019)	—	3 (1998, 2000, 2025)	5 (2004, 2006, 2008, 2013, 2026)
Chinese Taipei	1 (2013)	7 (2006, 2008, 2010, 2015, 2017, 2019, 2025)	1 (2004)	1 (2002)
Mongolia	—	—	1 (2026)	3 (1998, 2015, 2017
North Korea	—	—	1 (2019)	—
Hong Kong	—	—	—	3 (2000, 2010, 2025)

== Medal summary ==
Rank	Nation	Gold	Silver	Bronze	Total
1	Japan	6	1	4	11
2	South Korea	4	5	3	12
3	China	2	0	3	5
4	Chinese Taipei	1	7	1	9
5	Mongolia	0	0	1	1
5	North Korea	0	0	1	1
Totals (6 entries)		13	13	13	39

== Participating nations ==
Team	(Macau) 1998	(Mongolia) 2000	(China) 2002	(China) 2004	(Chinese Taipei) 2006	(Mongolia) 2008	(South Korea) 2010	(Chinese Taipei) 2013	(Mongolia) 2015	(Mongolia) 2017	(China) 2019	(China) 2025	(Mongolia) 2026	Total
China	3rd	3rd	1st	4th	4th	4th	•	4th	7th	•	1st	3rd	4th	11
Chinese Taipei	•	•	4th	3rd	2nd	2nd	2nd	1st	2nd	2nd	2nd	2nd	5th	11
Hong Kong	6th	6th	7th	5th	6th	5th	4th	5th	6th	6th	5th	4th	6th	13
Japan	1st	1st	3rd	1st	1st	3rd	3rd	3rd	1st	1st	•	•	2nd	11
Mongolia	4th	5th	5th	7th	•	6th	5th	•	4th	4th	•	5th	3rd	10
Macau	5th	4th	6th	6th	5th	7th	6th	6th	8th	7th	6th	6th	7th	13
North Korea	•	•	•	•	•	•	•	•	5th	5th	3rd	•	•	3
South Korea	2nd	2nd	2nd	2nd	3rd	1st	1st	2nd	3rd	3rd	4th	1st	1st	13

== Awards ==
=== Most Valuable Player ===
Year	Players
2013	(Chinese Taipei) Huang Chien-feng
2017	(Japan) Issei Otake
2019	(China) Yu Yuantai
2025	(South Korea) Im Dong-hyeok
2026	(South Korea) Shin Ho-jin

=== Best Coach ===
Year	Best Coach
2013	(Chinese Taipei) Yu Ching-fang
2017	(Japan) Matsui Taiji
2019	(China) Lu Weizhong
2025	(Brazil) Issanayê Ramires
2026	(Brazil) Issanayê Ramires
