= 2022 FIVB Men's Volleyball World Championship qualification =

- Dates: 22 August 2021 – 20 September 2021
- Teams: 77+2 (from 5 confederations)

The 2022 FIVB Men's Volleyball World Championship featured 24 teams. Two places were allocated to the host, Russia, and the current titleholder, Poland. Ten places will be allocated to the top two teams from each of the 2021 Continental Championships that have not yet qualified as host or titleholder. Remaining places will be allocated to the top twelve teams in the FIVB World Ranking that have not yet qualified through the first three criteria.

== Qualification summary ==
=== Qualified teams ===
Country	Confederation	Qualified as	Qualified on	Previous appearances			Previous best performance
Country	Confederation	Qualified as	Qualified on	Total	First	Last	Previous best performance
~~VFR~~^{a}	~~CEV~~	~~Host country~~	~~15 November 2018~~	~~19~~^{a}	1949	2018	Champions (1949, 1952, 1960, 1962, 1978, 1982)
Poland	CEV	Defending champions	30 September 2018	17	1949	2018	Champions (1974, 2014, 2018)
Puerto Rico	NORCECA	2021 NORCECA champions	22 August 2021	5	1974	2018	12th place (2006)
Canada	NORCECA	2021 NORCECA runners-up	22 August 2021	11	1974	2018	7th place (2014)
Brazil	CSV	2021 South American champions	4 September 2021	17	1956	2018	Champions (2002, 2006, 2010)
Argentina	CSV	2021 South American runners-up	4 September 2021	12	1960	2018	3rd place (1982)
Cameroon	CAVB	2021 African runners-up	13 September 2021	4	1990	2018	13th place (2010)
Tunisia	CAVB	2021 African champions	13 September 2021	10	1962	2018	15th place (2006)
Iran	AVC	2021 Asian champions	18 September 2021	6	1970	2018	6th place (2014)
Japan	AVC	2021 Asian runners-up	18 September 2021	15	1960	2018	3rd place (1970, 1974)
Slovenia	CEV	2021 European runners-up	18 September 2021	1	2018		12th place (2018)
Italy	CEV	2021 European champions	18 September 2021	17	1949	2018	Champions (1990, 1994, 1998)
France	CEV	1st World ranked non-qualified team	20 September 2021	16	1949	2018	3rd place (2002)
United States	NORCECA	2nd World ranked non-qualified team	20 September 2021	16	1956	2018	Champions (1986)
Serbia	CEV	3rd World ranked non-qualified team	20 September 2021	10^{b}	1956	2018	Runners-up (1998)
Cuba	NORCECA	4th World ranked non-qualified team	20 September 2021	15	1956	2018	Runners-up (1990, 2010)
Netherlands	CEV	5th World ranked non-qualified team	20 September 2021	12	1949	2018	Runners-up (1994)
Germany	CEV	6th World ranked non-qualified team	20 September 2021	11^{c}	1956	2014	Champions (1970)
Mexico	NORCECA	7th World ranked non-qualified team	20 September 2021	5	1974	2014	10th place (1974)
Turkey	CEV	8th World ranked non-qualified team	20 September 2021	3	1956	1998	15th place (1966)
Egypt	CAVB	9th World ranked non-qualified team	20 September 2021	9	1974	2018	13th place (2010)
Qatar	AVC	10th World ranked non-qualified team	20 September 2021	0	None		None
Bulgaria	CEV	11th World ranked non-qualified team	20 September 2021	18	1949	2018	Runners-up (1970)
China	AVC	12th World ranked non-qualified team	20 September 2021	14	1956	2018	7th place (1978, 1982)
Ukraine	CEV	Reallocation	15 April 2022	1	1998		10th place (1998)

Notes
^{a} Competed as Soviet Union from 1949 to 1990 (12 times); 7 appearances as Russia. Russia was initially suspended from competing under it national title due to Russia violating WADA regulations. Later, the team was removed completely from all FIVB and continental competitions due to the 2022 Russian invasion of Ukraine.
^{b} Competed as SFR Yugoslavia from 1956 to 1970 (4 times) and as Serbia and Montenegro (FR Yugoslavia) from 1998 to 2006 (3 times); 3 appearances as Serbia.
^{c} Competed as East Germany from 1956 to 1982 (7 times) and as West Germany from 1956 to 1966 (2 times); 4 appearances as Germany.

=== Timelines ===
Confederation	Tournament		Date	Venue	Teams
AVC (Asia and Oceania)	2019 Asian Championship		13–21 September 2019	(Iran) Tehran	16
AVC (Asia and Oceania)	2021 Asian Championship		12–19 September 2021	(Japan) Chiba and Funabashi	16
CAVB (Africa)	2021 African Championship		7–14 September 2021	(Rwanda) Kigali	16
CEV (Europe)	2019 European Championship		12–29 September 2019	Belgium, France, Netherlands and Slovenia	22+2
CEV (Europe)	2021 European Championship qualification	Pool A	7–16 May 2021	(Croatia) Zadar and (Netherlands) Rotterdam	3
CEV (Europe)	2021 European Championship qualification	Pool B	12–17 January 2021	(Israel) Hadera	3
CEV (Europe)	2021 European Championship qualification	Pool C	11–16 January 2021	(North Macedonia) Skopje	3
CEV (Europe)	2021 European Championship qualification	Pool D	30 August – 6 September 2020	(Cyprus) Nicosia	4
CEV (Europe)	2021 European Championship qualification	Pool E	6–16 May 2021	(Romania) Ploiești and (Slovakia) Nitra	4
CEV (Europe)	2021 European Championship qualification	Pool F	7–16 May 2021	(Georgia (country)) Tbilisi and (Montenegro) Podgorica	4
CEV (Europe)	2021 European Championship qualification	Pool G	7–16 May 2021	(Hungary) Budapest and (Portugal) Matosinhos	4
CEV (Europe)	2021 European Championship		1–19 September 2021	Czech Republic, Estonia, Finland and Poland	22+2
CSV (South America)	2021 South American Championship		1–5 September 2021	(Brazil) Brasília	5
NORCECA (North America)	2021 NORCECA Championship		18–23 August 2021	(Mexico) Durango City	8

== Host country ==
FIVB reserved a berth for the 2022 FIVB Men's Volleyball World Championship host country to participate in the tournament.

- ~~VFR~~ originally qualified as host country, but the team was removed due to 2022 Russian invasion of Ukraine.
- Ukraine has been invited to replace Russia in the competition line up as the next highest ranked team in the World Ranking.

FIVB announced that Poland and Slovenia will host the relocated 2022 FIVB Men's Volleyball World Championship on 15 April 2022.

== Defending champions ==
FIVB reserved a berth for the 2018 FIVB Men's Volleyball World Championship champions to participate in the tournament.

- Poland from CEV (Europe)

== AVC (Asia and Oceania) ==
=== Final positions (2021 Asian Championship) ===
Preliminary round

Qualification to Classification round

==== Pool A ====
Pos	Team	Pld	Pts
1	Japan	3	9
2	Qatar	3	6
3	Bahrain	3	3
4	India	3	0

Source: AVC

==== Pool B ====
Pos	Team	Pld	Pts
1	Iran	3	9
2	Pakistan	3	5
3	Thailand	3	4
4	Hong Kong	3	0

Source: AVC

==== Pool C ====
Pos	Team	Pld	Pts
1	Australia	3	8
2	China	3	7
3	Kuwait	3	3
4	Uzbekistan	3	0

Source: AVC

==== Pool D ====
Pos	Team	Pld	Pts
1	Chinese Taipei	3	9
2	South Korea	3	6
3	Saudi Arabia	3	3
4	Kazakhstan	3	0

Source: AVC

Classification round

Qualification to Play-offs finals

==== Pool E ====
Pos	Team	Pld	Pts
1	Japan	3	6
2	China	3	6
3	Qatar	3	4
4	Australia	3	2

Source: AVC

==== Pool F ====
Pos	Team	Pld	Pts
1	Iran	3	9
2	Chinese Taipei	3	6
3	Pakistan	3	3
4	South Korea	3	0

Source: AVC

Play-offs finals

Winners qualified for 2022 World Championship

Date	Time		Score		Set 1	Set 2	Set 3	Set 4	Set 5	Total	Report
18 Sep	15:05	China	1–3	Iran	22–25	25–17	22–25	17–25		86–92	P2
18 Sep	18:00	Japan	3–1	Chinese Taipei	25–16	22–25	25–21	25–20		97–82	P2

== CAVB (Africa) ==
=== Final positions (2021 African Championship) ===
Preliminary round

Qualification to Play-offs semifinals

==== Pool A ====
Pos	Team	Pld	Pts
1	Rwanda	3	8
2	Uganda	3	7
3	Burundi	3	3
4	Burkina Faso	3	0

Source: Flashscore

==== Pool B ====
Pos	Team	Pld	Pts
1	Tunisia	3	9
2	Nigeria	3	6
3	Ethiopia	3	2
4	South Sudan	3	1

Source: Flashscore

==== Pool C ====
Pos	Team	Pld	Pts
1	Cameroon	3	9
2	DR Congo	3	5
3	Mali	3	2
4	Niger	3	2

Source: Flashscore

==== Pool D ====
Pos	Team	Pld	Pts
1	Egypt	3	7
2	Morocco	3	6
3	Kenya	3	5
4	Tanzania	3	0

Source: Flashscore

Play-offs semifinals

Winners qualified for Play-offs finals

Date	Time	Venue		Score		Set 1	Set 2	Set 3	Set 4	Set 5	Total	Report
11 Sep	11:00	KGL	Cameroon	3–1	Nigeria	25–19	25–27	25–19	25–20		100–85	
11 Sep	13:00	KGL	Tunisia	3–0	DR Congo	25–22	25–17	25–21			75–60	
11 Sep	15:00	KGL	Egypt	3–1	Uganda	28–30	25–18	25–16	25–21		103–85	
11 Sep	17:00	KGL	Rwanda	0–3	Morocco	17–25	23–25	17–25			57–75	

Play-offs finals

Winners qualified for 2022 World Championship

Date	Time	Venue		Score		Set 1	Set 2	Set 3	Set 4	Set 5	Total	Report
13 Sep	14:00	KGL	Morocco	2–3	Cameroon	25–15	22–25	25–21	17–25	13–15	102–101	
13 Sep	16:00	KGL	Egypt	1–3	Tunisia	19–25	25–16	14–25	21–25		79–91	

== CEV (Europe) ==
=== Final positions (2021 European Championship) ===
Preliminary round

Qualification to Play-offs quarterfinals

==== Pool A ====
Pos	Team	Pld	Pts
1	Poland	5	14
2	Serbia	5	12
3	Ukraine	5	7
4	Portugal	5	6
5	Belgium	5	4
6	Greece	5	2

Source: CEV

==== Pool B ====
Pos	Team	Pld	Pts
1	Italy	5	15
2	Slovenia	5	9
3	Bulgaria	5	8
4	Czech Republic	5	7
5	Belarus	5	6
6	Montenegro	5	0

Source: CEV

==== Pool C ====
Pos	Team	Pld	Pts
1	Netherlands	5	13
2	Russia	5	11
3	Turkey	5	10
4	Finland	5	8
5	Spain	5	3
6	North Macedonia	5	0

Source: CEV

==== Pool D ====
Pos	Team	Pld	Pts
1	France	5	15
2	Germany	5	11
3	Croatia	5	7
4	Latvia	5	5
5	Slovakia	5	4
6	Estonia	5	3

Source: CEV

Play-offs quarterfinals

Winners qualified for Play-offs semifinals

Date	Time	Venue		Score		Set 1	Set 2	Set 3	Set 4	Set 5	Total	Report
11 Sep	17:30	ERA	Russia	3–1	Ukraine	22–25	25–16	25–22	25–22		97–85	Report
11 Sep	20:30	ERA	Poland	3–0	Finland	25–16	25–16	25–14			75–46	Report
12 Sep	16:00	OSA	Italy	3–0	Latvia	25–14	25–13	25–16			75–43	Report
12 Sep	17:30	ERA	Netherlands	3–2	Portugal	22–25	25–22	26–24	20–25	15–13	108–109	Report
12 Sep	19:00	OSA	Germany	3–1	Bulgaria	25–14	18–25	25–19	25–22		93–80	Report
12 Sep	20:30	ERA	Serbia	3–2	Turkey	25–18	22–25	22–25	25–23	15–12	109–103	Report
13 Sep	16:00	OSA	Slovenia	3–1	Croatia	25–20	25–18	19–25	25–12		94–75	Report
13 Sep	19:00	OSA	France	0–3	Czech Republic	22–25	19–25	32–34			73–84	Report

Play-offs semifinals

Winners qualified for Play-offs finals

Date	Time	Venue		Score		Set 1	Set 2	Set 3	Set 4	Set 5	Total	Report
14 Sep	17:30	ERA	Netherlands	0–3	Serbia	23–25	20–25	25–27			68–77	Report
14 Sep	20:30	ERA	Poland	3–0	Russia	25–14	26–24	25–19			76–57	Report
15 Sep	16:00	OSA	Italy	3–0	Germany	25–13	25–18	25–19			75–50	Report
15 Sep	19:00	OSA	Czech Republic	0–3	Slovenia	21–25	19–25	25–27			65–77	Report

Play-offs finals

Winners qualified for 2022 World Championship

Date	Time	Venue		Score		Set 1	Set 2	Set 3	Set 4	Set 5	Total	Report
18 Sep	17:30	SPO	Poland	1–3	Slovenia	25–17	30–32	16–25	35–37		106–111	Report
18 Sep	21:00	SPO	Serbia	1–3	Italy	27–29	22–25	25–23	18–25		92–102	Report

== CSV (South America) ==
=== Final positions (2021 South American Championship) ===
Round robin

Qualification to 2022 World Championship

Pos	Team	Pld	Pts
1	Brazil	4	12
2	Argentina	4	9
3	Chile	4	6
4	Colombia	4	3
5	Peru	4	0

Source: Flashscore

== NORCECA (North America) ==
=== Final positions (2021 NORCECA Championship) ===
Preliminary round

Qualification to Play-offs finals
Qualification to Play-offs semifinals

==== Pool A ====
Pos	Team	Pld	Pts
1	Mexico	3	14
2	Puerto Rico	3	11
3	Canada	3	5
4	Trinidad and Tobago	3	0

Source: NORCECA

==== Pool B ====
Pos	Team	Pld	Pts
1	Cuba	3	14
2	United States	3	7
3	Dominican Republic	3	6
4	Guatemala	3	3

Source: NORCECA

Play-offs semifinals

Winners qualified for Play-offs finals

Date	Time		Score		Set 1	Set 2	Set 3	Set 4	Set 5	Total	Report
21 Aug	18:00	United States	2–3	Canada	25–22	22–25	15–25	25–22	10–15	97–109	P2 P3
21 Aug	20:00	Puerto Rico	3–1	Dominican Republic	25–22	22–25	25–16	25–23		97–86	P2 P3

Play-offs finals

Winners qualified for 2022 World Championship

Date	Time		Score		Set 1	Set 2	Set 3	Set 4	Set 5	Total	Report
22 Aug	18:00	Cuba	1–3	Puerto Rico	16–25	25–19	24–26	29–31		94–101	P2 P3
22 Aug	20:00	Mexico	0–3	Canada	22–25	17–25	18–25			57–75	P2 P3
