= 1991 Asian Men's Volleyball Championship =

International volleyball tournament

Tournament details
- Host country: Australia
- City: Perth
- Dates: 11–16 August
- Teams: 15
- Venue: 1 (in 1 host city)

Final positions
- Champions: Japan (4th title)
- Runners-up: South Korea
- Third place: China
- Fourth place: Australia

The Asian Men's Volleyball Championship was the sixth staging of the Asian Men's Volleyball Championship, a biennial international volleyball tournament organised by the Asian Volleyball Confederation (AVC) with Australia Volleyball Federation (AVF). The tournament was held in Perth, Western Australia from 11 to 16 August 1991.

== Preliminary round ==
=== Pool A ===
| Pos | Team | Pld | W | L | Pts | SW | SL | SR | SPW | SPL | SPR | Qualification |
|---|---|---|---|---|---|---|---|---|---|---|---|---|
| 1 | Australia | 2 | 2 | 0 | 4 | 6 | 0 | MAX | 0 | 0 | — | Pool E |
| 2 | Chinese Taipei | 2 | 1 | 1 | 3 | 0 | 3 | 0.000 | 0 | 0 | — | Pool E |
| 3 | New Zealand | 2 | 0 | 2 | 2 | 1 | 6 | 0.167 | 51 | 93 | 0.548 | 9th–12th place |

| Date | | Score | | Set 1 | Set 2 | Set 3 | Set 4 | Set 5 | Total |
|---|---|---|---|---|---|---|---|---|---|
| 11 Aug | Australia | 3–1 | New Zealand | 15–3 | 15–9 | 3–15 | 15–10 | | 48–37 |
| 12 Aug | Australia | 3–? | Chinese Taipei | | | | | | |
| 13 Aug | Chinese Taipei | 3–0 | New Zealand | 15–6 | 15–5 | 15–3 | | | 45–14 |

=== Pool B ===
| Pos | Team | Pld | W | L | Pts | SW | SL | SR | SPW | SPL | SPR | Qualification |
|---|---|---|---|---|---|---|---|---|---|---|---|---|
| 1 | South Korea | 3 | 3 | 0 | 6 | 9 | 0 | MAX | 137 | 46 | 2.978 | Pool F |
| 2 | Iran | 3 | 2 | 1 | 5 | 6 | 3 | 2.000 | 117 | 93 | 1.258 | Pool F |
| 3 | Thailand | 3 | 1 | 2 | 4 | 1 | 7 | 0.143 | 96 | 126 | 0.762 | 9th–12th place |
| 4 | United Arab Emirates | 3 | 0 | 3 | 3 | 1 | 9 | 0.111 | 63 | 148 | 0.426 | 13th–15th place |

| Date | | Score | | Set 1 | Set 2 | Set 3 | Set 4 | Set 5 | Total |
|---|---|---|---|---|---|---|---|---|---|
| 11 Aug | Thailand | 3–1 | United Arab Emirates | 15–9 | 13–15 | 15–7 | 15–5 | | 58–36 |
| 11 Aug | South Korea | 3–0 | Iran | 15–6 | 15–6 | 17–15 | | | 47–27 |
| 12 Aug | South Korea | 3–0 | Thailand | 15–0 | 15–3 | 15–7 | | | 45–10 |
| 12 Aug | Iran | 3–0 | United Arab Emirates | 15–4 | 15–6 | 15–8 | | | 45–18 |
| 13 Aug | Iran | 3–0 | Thailand | 15–9 | 15–7 | 15–12 | | | 45–28 |
| 13 Aug | South Korea | 3–0 | United Arab Emirates | 15–2 | 15–5 | 15–2 | | | 45–9 |

=== Pool C ===
| Pos | Team | Pld | W | L | Pts | SW | SL | SR | SPW | SPL | SPR | Qualification |
|---|---|---|---|---|---|---|---|---|---|---|---|---|
| 1 | Japan | 3 | 3 | 0 | 6 | 9 | 0 | MAX | 135 | 0 | MAX | Pool E |
| 2 | Indonesia | 3 | 2 | 1 | 5 | 6 | 5 | 1.200 | 0 | 138 | 0.000 | Pool E |
| 3 | India | 3 | 1 | 2 | 4 | 4 | 6 | 0.667 | 0 | 0 | — | 9th–12th place |
| 4 | Saudi Arabia | 3 | 0 | 3 | 3 | 1 | 9 | 0.111 | 0 | 150 | 0.000 | 13th–15th place |

| Date | | Score | | Set 1 | Set 2 | Set 3 | Set 4 | Set 5 | Total |
|---|---|---|---|---|---|---|---|---|---|
| 11 Aug | Japan | 3–0 | Indonesia | 15–4 | 15–? | 15–? | | | 45–? |
| 11 Aug | India | 3–0 | Saudi Arabia | 15–? | 15–5 | 16–14 | | | 45–? |
| 12 Aug | Japan | 3–0 | India | 15–3 | 15–10 | 15–? | | | 45–? |
| 12 Aug | Indonesia | 3–1 | Saudi Arabia | 15–7 | 15–17 | 15–9 | 15–13 | | 60–46 |
| 13 Aug | Indonesia | 3–1 | India | 15–13 | 11–15 | 15–9 | 15-10 | | 56–47 |
| 13 Aug | Japan | 3–0 | Saudi Arabia | 15–1 | 15–8 | 15–3 | | | 45–12 |

=== Pool D ===
| Pos | Team | Pld | W | L | Pts | SW | SL | SR | SPW | SPL | SPR | Qualification |
|---|---|---|---|---|---|---|---|---|---|---|---|---|
| 1 | China | 3 | 3 | 0 | 6 | 9 | 0 | MAX | 135 | 27 | 5.000 | Pool F |
| 2 | Pakistan | 3 | 2 | 1 | 5 | 6 | 5 | 1.200 | 0 | 0 | — | Pool F |
| 3 | North Korea | 3 | 1 | 2 | 4 | 5 | 6 | 0.833 | 0 | 0 | — | 9th–12th place |
| 4 | Western Samoa | 3 | 0 | 3 | 3 | 0 | 9 | 0.000 | 30 | 135 | 0.222 | 13th–15th place |

| Date | | Score | | Set 1 | Set 2 | Set 3 | Set 4 | Set 5 | Total |
|---|---|---|---|---|---|---|---|---|---|
| 11 Aug | North Korea | 3–0 | Western Samoa | 15–8 | 15–7 | 15–4 | | | 45–19 |
| 11 Aug | China | 3–0 | Pakistan | 15–3 | 15–6 | 15–2 | | | 45–11 |
| 12 Aug | China | 3–0 | Western Samoa | 15–4 | 15–0 | 15–0 | | | 45–4 |
| 12 Aug | Pakistan | 3–2 | North Korea | | | | | | |
| 13 Aug | Pakistan | 3–0 | Western Samoa | 15–5 | 15–0 | 15–2 | | | 45–7 |
| 13 Aug | China | 3–0 | North Korea | 15–2 | 15–2 | 15–8 | | | 45–12 |

== Classification round ==
=== Pool E ===
| Pos | Team | Pld | W | L | Pts | SW | SL | SR | SPW | SPL | SPR | Qualification |
|---|---|---|---|---|---|---|---|---|---|---|---|---|
| 1 | Japan | 3 | 3 | 0 | 6 | 9 | 0 | MAX | 0 | 0 | — | Semifinals |
| 2 | Australia | 3 | 2 | 1 | 5 | 6 | 3 | 2.000 | 0 | 0 | — | Semifinals |
| 3 | Chinese Taipei | 3 | 1 | 2 | 4 | 3 | 8 | 0.375 | 0 | 0 | — | 5th–8th place |
| 4 | Indonesia | 3 | 0 | 3 | 3 | 2 | 9 | 0.222 | 0 | 0 | — | 5th–8th place |

| Date | | Score | | Set 1 | Set 2 | Set 3 | Set 4 | Set 5 | Total |
|---|---|---|---|---|---|---|---|---|---|
| 14 Aug | Japan | 3–0 | Chinese Taipei | 15–4 | 15–3 | 15–5 | | | 45–12 |
| 14 Aug | Australia | 3–0 | Indonesia | 15–7 | 15–3 | 15–13 | | | 45–23 |
| 15 Aug | Chinese Taipei | 3–2 | Indonesia | | | | | | |
| 15 Aug | Japan | 3–1 | Australia | 15–11 | 16–14 | 15–10 | | | 46–35 |

=== Pool F ===
| Pos | Team | Pld | W | L | Pts | SW | SL | SR | SPW | SPL | SPR | Qualification |
|---|---|---|---|---|---|---|---|---|---|---|---|---|
| 1 | South Korea | 3 | 3 | 0 | 6 | 9 | 2 | 4.500 | 0 | 0 | — | Semifinals |
| 2 | China | 3 | 2 | 1 | 5 | 8 | 3 | 2.667 | 0 | 0 | — | Semifinals |
| 3 | Pakistan | 3 | 1 | 2 | 4 | 3 | 8 | 0.375 | 0 | 0 | — | 5th–8th place |
| 4 | Iran | 3 | 0 | 3 | 3 | 2 | 9 | 0.222 | 0 | 0 | — | 5th–8th place |

| Date | | Score | | Set 1 | Set 2 | Set 3 | Set 4 | Set 5 | Total |
|---|---|---|---|---|---|---|---|---|---|
| 14 Aug | South Korea | 3–0 | Pakistan | 15–4 | 15–3 | 15–7 | | | 45–14 |
| 14 Aug | China | 3–0 | Iran | 15–11 | 15–4 | 15–4 | | | 45–19 |
| 15 Aug | Pakistan | 3–2 | Iran | 16–4 | 5–15 | 15–11 | 13–15 | 15–10 | 64–55 |
| 15 Aug | South Korea | 3–2 | China | 16–17(?) | 15–9 | 15–1 | 13–15 | 15–? | |

== Final round ==
=== Classification 13th–15th ===
13th–15th semifinals
14 August – Perth
United Arab Emirates | 3
Western Samoa | 0
Saudi Arabia | Bye

13th place match
15 August – Perth
United Arab Emirates | 1
Saudi Arabia | 3
15th place match
Western Samoa | Bye

==== 13th–15th semifinals ====
| Date | | Score | | Set 1 | Set 2 | Set 3 | Set 4 | Set 5 | Total |
|---|---|---|---|---|---|---|---|---|---|
| 14 Aug | United Arab Emirates | 3–0 | Western Samoa | 15–3 | 15–4 | 15–5 | | | 45–12 |

==== 13th place match ====
| Date | | Score | | Set 1 | Set 2 | Set 3 | Set 4 | Set 5 | Total |
|---|---|---|---|---|---|---|---|---|---|
| 15 Aug | Saudi Arabia | 3–1 | United Arab Emirates | 15–6 | 15–12 | 13–15 | 15-11 | | 58–44 |

=== Classification 9th–12th ===
9th–12th semifinals
14 August – Perth
Thailand | 3
North Korea | 2
14 August – Perth
India | 3
New Zealand | 0

9th place match
15 August – Perth
Thailand | 3
India | 2
11th place match
15 August – Perth
North Korea | 3
New Zealand | 2

==== 9th–12th semifinals ====
| Date | | Score | | Set 1 | Set 2 | Set 3 | Set 4 | Set 5 | Total |
|---|---|---|---|---|---|---|---|---|---|
| 14 Aug | India | 3–0 | New Zealand | 15–5 | 15–11 | 15–5 | | | 45–35 |
| 14 Aug | Thailand | 3–2 | North Korea | 4–15 | 8–15 | 15–13 | 15–1 | 15–10 | 57–54 |

==== 11th place match ====
| Date | | Score | | Set 1 | Set 2 | Set 3 | Set 4 | Set 5 | Total |
|---|---|---|---|---|---|---|---|---|---|
| 15 Aug | North Korea | 3–2 | New Zealand | 9–15 | 10–15 | 15–10 | 15-13 | 15-6 | 64–59 |

==== 9th place match ====
| Date | | Score | | Set 1 | Set 2 | Set 3 | Set 4 | Set 5 | Total |
|---|---|---|---|---|---|---|---|---|---|
| 15 Aug | Thailand | 3–2 | India | 15–4 | 15–13 | 9–15 | 4-15 | 15-11 | 58–58 |

=== Classification 5th–8th ===
5th–8th semifinals
17 August – Perth
Chinese Taipei | 3
Iran
17 August – Perth
Indonesia | 3
Pakistan

5th place match
18 August – Perth
Chinese Taipei | 3
Indonesia | 1
7th place match
18 August – Perth
Iran | 3
Pakistan | 2

==== 9th–12th semifinals ====
| Date | | Score | | Set 1 | Set 2 | Set 3 | Set 4 | Set 5 | Total |
|---|---|---|---|---|---|---|---|---|---|
| 17 Aug | Chinese Taipei | 3–? | Iran | | | | | | |
| 17 Aug | Indonesia | 3–? | Pakistan | | | | | | |

==== 7th place match ====
| Date | | Score | | Set 1 | Set 2 | Set 3 | Set 4 | Set 5 | Total |
|---|---|---|---|---|---|---|---|---|---|
| 18 Aug | Iran | 3–2 | Pakistan | 12–15 | 10–15 | 15–12 | 15-11 | 15-12 | 67–65 |

==== 5th place match ====
| Date | | Score | | Set 1 | Set 2 | Set 3 | Set 4 | Set 5 | Total |
|---|---|---|---|---|---|---|---|---|---|
| 18 Aug | Chinese Taipei | 3–1 | Indonesia | 6–15 | 15–11 | 15–6 | 15-13 | | 51–45 |

=== Championship ===
Semifinals
17 August
Japan | 3
China | 1
17 August
South Korea | 3
Australia | 0

Final
18 August
Japan | 3
South Korea | 2
3rd place
18 August
China | 3
Australia | 0

==== Semifinals ====
| Date | | Score | | Set 1 | Set 2 | Set 3 | Set 4 | Set 5 | Total |
|---|---|---|---|---|---|---|---|---|---|
| 17 Aug | South Korea | 3–0 | Australia | 15–2 | 17–16 | 15–11 | | | 47–29 |
| 17 Aug | Japan | 3–1 | China | 15–7 | 15–7 | 5–15 | 15–4 | | 50–33 |

==== 3rd place match ====
| Date | | Score | | Set 1 | Set 2 | Set 3 | Set 4 | Set 5 | Total |
|---|---|---|---|---|---|---|---|---|---|
| 18 Aug | China | 3–0 | Australia | 15–11 | 15–2 | 15–9 | | | 45–22 |

==== Final ====
| Date | | Score | | Set 1 | Set 2 | Set 3 | Set 4 | Set 5 | Total |
|---|---|---|---|---|---|---|---|---|---|
| 18 Aug | Japan | 3–2 | South Korea | 10–15 | 16–14 | 15–13 | 10–15 | 15–8 | 66–65 |

== Final standing ==
| Rank | Team |
|---|---|
| 1st place, gold medalist(s) | Japan |
| 2nd place, silver medalist(s) | South Korea |
| 3rd place, bronze medalist(s) | China |
| 4 | Australia |
| 5 | Chinese Taipei |
| 6 | Indonesia |
| 7 | Iran |
| 8 | Pakistan |
| 9 | Thailand |
| 10 | India |
| 11 | North Korea |
| 12 | New Zealand |
| 13 | Saudi Arabia |
| 14 | United Arab Emirates |
| 15 | Western Samoa |

| Qualified for the 1991 World Cup |
| Already qualified as hosts for the 1991 World Cup and qualified for 1992 Summer Olympics |
| Qualified for the 1992 Summer Olympics qualifier |

1991 Asian Men's champions

Japan
4th title
