= 2019 Eastern Asian Men's Volleyball Championship =

2019 AVC Eastern Zonal Men's Volleyball Championship
2019年亞洲東區男子排球錦標賽

Tournament details
- Host country: China
- City: Zhangjiagang
- Dates: 16–21 July 2019
- Teams: 6
- Venue: 1 (in 1 host city)

Final positions
- Champions: China (2nd title)
- Runners-up: Chinese Taipei
- Third place: North Korea
- Fourth place: South Korea

Tournament awards
- MVP: (China) Yu Yuantai

The 2019 Eastern Asian Men's Volleyball Championship was the 10th edition of the AVC Eastern Zonal Men's Volleyball Championship, the volleyball championship of East Asia. It was held in Zhangjiagang, China from 16 to 21 July 2019.

On 21 July, China were the defending champions and won their second title. Yu Yuantai was elected the most valuable player.

== Competing nations ==
The following national teams participated:

- China
- Chinese Taipei
- Hong Kong
- South Korea
- Macau
- North Korea

== Venue ==
Zhangjiagang, China	Zhangjiagang is located in China
Zhangjiagang Sports Center	Zhangjiagang is located in China
Capacity: 3,750	Zhangjiagang is located in China

== Round-Robin ==
- All times are China standard time (UTC+08:00).

Pos	Team	Pld	W	L	Pts	SW	SL	SR	SPW	SPL	SPR
1	China	5	5	0	14	15	3	5.000	436	347	1.256
2	Chinese Taipei	5	4	1	12	13	6	2.167	457	417	1.096
3	North Korea	5	3	2	8	10	9	1.111	436	439	0.993
4	South Korea	5	2	3	7	10	9	1.111	436	387	1.127
5	Hong Kong	5	1	4	3	5	13	0.385	372	425	0.875
6	Macau	5	0	5	1	3	15	0.200	311	433	0.718

Date	Time		Score		Set 1	Set 2	Set 3	Set 4	Set 5	Total	Report
16 Jul	14:00	South Korea	3–0	Macau	25–19	25–5	25–9			75–33	Report
16 Jul	16:00	North Korea	1–3	Chinese Taipei	23–25	25–22	20–25	15–25		83–97	Report
16 Jul	19:00	China	3–0	Hong Kong	25–21	25–15	25–15			75–51	Report
17 Jul	14:00	Chinese Taipei	3–1	South Korea	25–20	27–29	25–22	25–23		102–94	
17 Jul	16:00	Hong Kong	1–3	North Korea	19–25	25–22	23–25	24–26		91–98	
17 Jul	19:00	China	3–0	Macau	25–14	25–18	25–15			75–47	
18 Jul	14:00	Macau	0–3	Chinese Taipei	19–25	18–25	21–25			58–75	
18 Jul	16:00	South Korea	3–0	Hong Kong	25–20	25–22	25–11			75–53	
18 Jul	19:00	China	3–0	North Korea	25–18	25–15	25–21			75–54	
20 Jul	14:00	Hong Kong	1–3	Chinese Taipei	15–25	25–21	20–25	20–25		80–96	
20 Jul	16:00	North Korea	3–2	Macau	23–25	25–14	23–25	25–16	15–12	111–92	
20 Jul	19:00	China	3–2	South Korea	22–25	26–24	26–24	20–25	15–10	109–108	
21 Jul	14:00	North Korea	3–1	South Korea	25–23	25–15	15–25	25–21		90–84	
21 Jul	16:00	Hong Kong	3–1	Macau	22–25	25–19	25–16	25–21		97–81	
21 Jul	19:00	China	3–1	Chinese Taipei	25–20	27–29	25–22	25–16		102–87	

== Final standing ==
Rank	Team
1st place, gold medalist(s)	China
2nd place, silver medalist(s)	Chinese Taipei
3rd place, bronze medalist(s)	North Korea
4	South Korea
5	Hong Kong
6	Macau

2019 AVC Eastern Men's champions

China
2nd title

== Awards ==
- MVP: (China) Yu Yuantai
- Best Coach: (China) Lu Weizhong
