= 2023 Men's European Volleyball Championship qualification =

Volleyball Championship qualifiers

This article describes the qualification for the 2023 Men's European Volleyball Championship.

== Qualification ==
Italy, North Macedonia, Bulgaria and Israel as host countries were directly qualified. The eight best placed teams at the 2021 edition also gained direct entries into the tournament. 24 teams compete for the remaining 12 places at the final tournament.

Means of qualification	Qualifier	Means of qualification		Qualifier
Host Countries	Italy	Qualification	Pool A	Turkey
Host Countries	North Macedonia	Qualification	Pool B	Finland
Host Countries	Bulgaria	Qualification	Pool C	Belgium
Host Countries	Israel	Qualification	Pool D	Portugal
2021 European Championship	Slovenia	Qualification	Pool E	Greece
2021 European Championship	Poland	Qualification	Pool F	Spain
2021 European Championship	Serbia	Qualification	Pool G	Romania
2021 European Championship	Netherlands	Qualification	Best runners-up	Switzerland
2021 European Championship	Germany	Qualification	Best runners-up	Denmark
2021 European Championship	Czech Republic	Qualification	Best runners-up	Montenegro
2021 European Championship	France	Qualification	Best runners-up	Estonia
Reallocation	Ukraine	Qualification	Best runners-up	Croatia
Total 24

== Direct qualification ==
All of the hosted countries' teams directly qualified for the tournament. Then, the top eight teams from previous edition also automatically qualified.

- 2021 Men's European Volleyball Championship final standing

Qualified for the 2023 European Championship
Qualified as hosts for the 2023 European Championship

Rank	Team
1st place, gold medalist(s)	Italy
2nd place, silver medalist(s)	Slovenia
3rd place, bronze medalist(s)	Poland
4	Serbia
5	Netherlands
6	Germany
7	~~Russia~~ (Note: Russian and Belarusian athletes were banned from competing following the 2022 Russian invasion of Ukraine.)
8	Czech Republic
9	France
10	Turkey
11	Bulgaria
12	Finland
13	Ukraine
14	Croatia
15	Portugal
16	Latvia
17	~~Belarus~~
18	Belgium
19	Slovakia
20	Spain
21	Estonia
22	Greece
23	North Macedonia
24	Montenegro
–	Israel

== Format ==
There being seven pools of either three or four teams each, the winners of each pool and the 5 best runners-up qualified for the 2023 European Championship. The pools were played in a double round-robin tournaments format officially from 3 to 21 August 2022, according to the CEV web site. Since there was a different number of teams across the seven pools, the results of the matches played with the teams finishing last in the pools of four were discarded in order to determine the five best runners-up across all pools.

== Pools composition ==
The pools were set following the Serpentine system according to their European Ranking for national teams as of January 2022. Rankings are shown in brackets.

Pool A	Pool B	Pool C	Pool D	Pool E	Pool F	Pool G
Turkey (9)	Finland (12)	Belgium (13)	Portugal (14)	Croatia (15)	Slovakia (18)	Romania (19)
Azerbaijan (28)	Latvia (26)	Estonia (25)	Montenegro (24)	Greece (22)	Spain (21)	Switzerland (20)
Denmark (29)	Austria (30)	~~Israel (31)~~	Luxembourg (32)	Norway (33)	Hungary (34)	Bosnia and Herzegovina (35)
		Faroe Islands (43)	Iceland (39)	Cyprus (38)	Georgia (37)	Albania (36)

== Pool standing procedure ==
1. Number of matches won
2. Match points
3. Sets ratio
4. Points ratio
5. If the tie continues as per the point ratio between two teams, the priority will be given to the team which won the last match between them. When the tie in points ratio is between three or more teams, a new classification of these teams in the terms of points 1, 2 and 3 will be made taking into consideration only the matches in which they were opposed to each other.

Match won 3–0 or 3–1: 3 match points for the winner, 0 match points for the loser
Match won 3–2: 2 match points for the winner, 1 match point for the loser

== Results ==
- The winners in each pool and the top five of the second ranked teams qualified for the 2023 European Championship.

=== Pool A ===
Pos	Team	Pld	W	L	Pts	SW	SL	SR	SPW	SPL	SPR	Qualification
1	Turkey	4	3	1	10	11	4	2.750	349	278	1.255	2023 European Championship
2	Denmark	4	3	1	8	10	6	1.667	354	331	1.069	2023 European Championship
3	Azerbaijan	4	0	4	0	1	12	0.083	229	323	0.709	

Date	Time		Score		Set 1	Set 2	Set 3	Set 4	Set 5	Total	Report
3 Aug	18:00	Azerbaijan	1–3	Denmark	22–25	25–23	16–25	16–25		79–98	Report
6 Aug	17:30	Azerbaijan	0–3	Turkey	11–25	20–25	16–25			47–75	Report
10 Aug	17:30	Turkey	3–1	Denmark	19–25	25–16	25–22	25–11		94–74	Report
14 Aug	17:00	Denmark	3–2	Turkey	25–20	19–25	28–26	20–25	15–9	107–105	Report
17 Aug	17:30	Turkey	3–0	Azerbaijan	25–15	25–16	25–19			75–50	Report
20 Aug	19:00	Denmark	3–0	Azerbaijan	25–19	25–19	25–15			75–53	Report

=== Pool B ===
Pos	Team	Pld	W	L	Pts	SW	SL	SR	SPW	SPL	SPR	Qualification
1	Finland	4	4	0	11	12	4	3.000	377	318	1.186	2023 European Championship
2	Latvia	4	2	2	5	7	9	0.778	339	365	0.929	
3	Austria	4	0	4	2	6	12	0.500	380	413	0.920	

Date	Time		Score		Set 1	Set 2	Set 3	Set 4	Set 5	Total	Report
3 Aug	20:25	Austria	1–3	Latvia	19–25	25–21	22–25	23–25		89–96	Report
6 Aug	18:00	Latvia	1–3	Finland	17–25	19–25	25–20	22–25		83–95	Report
10 Aug	19:00	Finland	3–1	Austria	25–21	23–25	25–16	25–17		98–79	Report
14 Aug	20:25	Austria	2–3	Finland	20–25	25–23	25–21	23–25	13–15	106–109	Report
17 Aug	18:30	Finland	3–0	Latvia	25–18	25–17	25–15			75–50	Report
21 Aug	17:00	Latvia	3–2	Austria	23–25	21–25	25–20	26–24	15–12	110–106	Report

=== Pool C ===
Pos	Team	Pld	W	L	Pts	SW	SL	SR	SPW	SPL	SPR	Qualification
1	Belgium	4	4	0	11	12	2	6.000	340	254	1.339	2023 European Championship
2	Estonia	4	2	2	7	8	6	1.333	321	266	1.207	2023 European Championship
3	Faroe Islands	4	0	4	0	0	12	0.000	159	300	0.530	

Date	Time		Score		Set 1	Set 2	Set 3	Set 4	Set 5	Total	Report
3 Aug	20:00	Belgium	3–0	Faroe Islands	25–7	25–15	25–9			75–31	Report
7 Aug	16:00	Estonia	2–3	Belgium	25–22	19–25	24–26	26–24	16–18	110–115	Report
10 Aug	19:00	Faroe Islands	0–3	Estonia	11–25	7–25	15–25			33–75	Report
13 Aug	18:00	Estonia	3–0	Faroe Islands	25–12	25–16	25–15			75–43	Report
17 Aug	20:00	Belgium	3–0	Estonia	25–17	25–22	25–22			75–61	Report
21 Aug	17:00	Faroe Islands	0–3	Belgium	16–25	16–25	20–25			52–75	Report

=== Pool D ===
Pos	Team	Pld	W	L	Pts	SW	SL	SR	SPW	SPL	SPR	Qualification
1	Portugal	6	5	1	16	17	3	5.667	484	348	1.391	2023 European Championship
2	Montenegro	6	5	1	14	15	6	2.500	490	413	1.186	2023 European Championship
3	Luxembourg	6	2	4	6	7	12	0.583	390	456	0.855	
4	Iceland	6	0	6	0	0	18	0.000	306	453	0.675	

Date	Time		Score		Set 1	Set 2	Set 3	Set 4	Set 5	Total	Report
3 Aug	18:00	Montenegro	3–0	Luxembourg	25–15	25–14	25–17			75–46	Report
3 Aug	21:00	Portugal	3–0	Iceland	25–14	25–16	25–10			75–40	Report
7 Aug	15:00	Iceland	0–3	Luxembourg	18–25	20–25	24–26			62–76	Report
7 Aug	17:30	Montenegro	3–2	Portugal	21–25	25–22	25–20	25–27	15–13	111–107	Report
10 Aug	18:00	Montenegro	3–0	Iceland	25–15	25–10	25–16			75–41	Report
10 Aug	21:00	Portugal	3–0	Luxembourg	25–19	25–16	25–16			75–51	Report
13 Aug	19:00	Luxembourg	0–3	Portugal	17–25	16–25	20–25			53–75	Report
14 Aug	15:00	Iceland	0–3	Montenegro	21–25	18–25	16–25			55–75	Report
17 Aug	19:00	Luxembourg	3–0	Iceland	27–25	25–20	25–22			77–67	Report
17 Aug	21:00	Portugal	3–0	Montenegro	27–25	25–15	25–12			77–52	Report
20 Aug	19:00	Luxembourg	1–3	Montenegro	25–27	22–25	27–25	13–25		87–102	Report
21 Aug	15:00	Iceland	0–3	Portugal	12–25	12–25	17–25			41–75	Report

=== Pool E ===
Pos	Team	Pld	W	L	Pts	SW	SL	SR	SPW	SPL	SPR	Qualification
1	Greece	6	6	0	17	18	3	6.000	511	426	1.200	2023 European Championship
2	Croatia	6	4	2	12	13	6	2.167	445	389	1.144	2023 European Championship
3	Cyprus	6	2	4	6	6	12	0.500	371	434	0.855	
4	Norway	6	0	6	1	2	18	0.111	410	488	0.840	

Date	Time		Score		Set 1	Set 2	Set 3	Set 4	Set 5	Total	Report
3 Aug	18:00	Norway	2–3	Greece	25–19	27–25	23–25	21–25	9–15	105–109	Report
3 Aug	19:00	Croatia	3–0	Cyprus	25–20	25–16	25–13			75–49	Report
6 Aug	20:00	Cyprus	3–0	Norway	25–19	27–25	25–21			77–65	Report
7 Aug	20:30	Greece	3–0	Croatia	25–12	25–23	25–15			75–50	Report
10 Aug	19:00	Croatia	3–0	Norway	25–21	25–18	25–19			75–58	Report
10 Aug	20:30	Greece	3–0	Cyprus	25–19	25–19	25–19			75–57	Report
13 Aug	20:00	Cyprus	0–3	Greece	23–25	17–25	20–25			60–75	Report
14 Aug	16:00	Norway	0–3	Croatia	18–25	19–25	17–25			54–75	Report
17 Aug	18:00	Norway	0–3	Cyprus	22–25	24–26	23–25			69–76	Report
17 Aug	19:00	Croatia	1–3	Greece	25–23	22–25	22–25	26–28		95–101	Report
20 Aug	20:00	Cyprus	0–3	Croatia	14–25	21–25	17–25			52–75	Report
21 Aug	20:30	Greece	3–0	Norway	26–24	25–17	25–18			76–59	Report

=== Pool F ===
Pos	Team	Pld	W	L	Pts	SW	SL	SR	SPW	SPL	SPR	Qualification
1	Spain	6	6	0	17	18	3	6.000	502	370	1.357	2023 European Championship
2	Slovakia	6	4	2	12	13	7	1.857	465	402	1.157	
3	Hungary	6	2	4	7	9	12	0.750	453	435	1.041	
4	Georgia	6	0	6	0	0	18	0.000	237	450	0.527	

Date	Time		Score		Set 1	Set 2	Set 3	Set 4	Set 5	Total	Report
3 Aug	17:00	Hungary	2–3	Spain	17–25	25–19	25–23	23–25	8–15	98–107	Report
3 Aug	18:00	Slovakia	3–0	Georgia	25–14	25–21	25–9			75–44	Report
6 Aug	17:00	Georgia	0–3	Hungary	12–25	17–25	13–25			42–75	Report
7 Aug	20:00	Spain	3–0	Slovakia	25–18	25–20	25–18			75–56	Report
10 Aug	18:00	Slovakia	3–0	Hungary	25–20	25–22	25–22			75–64	Report
10 Aug	20:00	Spain	3–0	Georgia	25–5	25–14	25–15			75–34	Report
13 Aug	17:00	Georgia	0–3	Spain	9–25	10–25	17–25			36–75	Report
13 Aug	18:00	Hungary	1–3	Slovakia	21–25	16–25	25–22	20–25		82–97	Report
17 Aug	18:00	Slovakia	1–3	Spain	21–25	25–19	20–25	21–25		87–94	Report
17 Aug	18:00	Hungary	3–0	Georgia	25–14	25–13	25–11			75–38	Report
20 Aug	17:00	Georgia	0–3	Slovakia	12–25	15–25	16–25			43–75	Report
21 Aug	20:00	Spain	3–0	Hungary	25–20	25–15	26–24			76–59	Report

=== Pool G ===
Pos	Team	Pld	W	L	Pts	SW	SL	SR	SPW	SPL	SPR	Qualification
1	Romania	6	5	1	15	17	6	2.833	524	443	1.183	2023 European Championship
2	Switzerland	6	5	1	15	17	7	2.429	555	472	1.176	2023 European Championship
3	Bosnia and Herzegovina	6	1	5	4	7	16	0.438	480	513	0.936	
4	Albania	6	1	5	2	5	17	0.294	394	525	0.750	

Date	Time		Score		Set 1	Set 2	Set 3	Set 4	Set 5	Total	Report
3 Aug	17:00	Romania	3–0	Albania	25–16	25–15	25–16			75–47	Report
3 Aug	20:00	Bosnia and Herzegovina	1–3	Switzerland	25–23	23–25	18–25	19–25		85–98	Report
6 Aug	19:00	Bosnia and Herzegovina	2–3	Albania	25–19	25–11	22–25	21–25	13–15	106–95	Report
7 Aug	17:30	Switzerland	3–2	Romania	26–24	18–25	23–25	25–23	15–8	107–105	Report
7 Aug	19:00	Albania	1–3	Bosnia and Herzegovina	18–25	18–25	25–21	15–25		76–96	Report
10 Aug	17:00	Romania	3–1	Bosnia and Herzegovina	25–20	19–25	25–16	25–20		94–81	Report
10 Aug	19:30	Switzerland	3–1	Albania	23–25	25–20	25–16	25–10		98–71	Report
11 Aug	17:00	Bosnia and Herzegovina	0–3	Romania	20–25	17–25	20–25			57–75	Report
13 Aug	19:00	Albania	0–3	Switzerland	19–25	15–25	22–25			56–75	Report
17 Aug	17:00	Romania	3–2	Switzerland	25–22	17–25	25–19	18–25	15–11	100–102	Report
20 Aug	19:00	Albania	0–3	Romania	13–25	19–25	17–25			49–75	Report
21 Aug	17:30	Switzerland	3–0	Bosnia and Herzegovina	25–16	25–19	25–20			75–55	Report

=== Ranking of the second placed teams ===
- Matches against the fourth placed team in each pool were not included in this ranking.
- The top five of the second placed teams qualified for the 2023 European Championship.

Pos	Team	Pld	W	L	Pts	SW	SL	SR	SPW	SPL	SPR	Qualification
1	Switzerland	4	3	1	9	11	6	1.833	382	345	1.107	2023 European Championship
2	Denmark	4	3	1	8	10	6	1.667	354	331	1.069	2023 European Championship
3	Montenegro	4	3	1	8	9	6	1.500	340	317	1.073	2023 European Championship
4	Estonia	4	2	2	7	8	6	1.333	321	266	1.207	2023 European Championship
5	Croatia	4	2	2	6	7	6	1.167	295	277	1.065	2023 European Championship
6	Slovakia	4	2	2	6	7	7	1.000	315	315	1.000	
7	Latvia	4	2	2	5	7	9	0.778	339	365	0.929	
