= 1970 FIVB Men's Volleyball World Championship =

Volleyball championship

1970 FIVB World Championship
Tournament details
- Host country: Bulgaria
- Dates: 29 September – 12 October
- Teams: 24
- Venues: 4 (in 4 host cities)
- Officially opened by: Georgi Traykov

Final positions
- Champions: East Germany (1st title)

Tournament awards
- MVP: (East Germany) Rudi Schumann

The 1970 FIVB Men's World Championship was the seventh edition of the tournament, organised by the world's governing body, the FIVB. It was held from 29 September to 12 October 1970 in Bulgaria.

== Qualification ==
Means of qualification	Date	Host	Vacancies	Qualified
Host Country	—N/a	—N/a	1	Bulgaria
1966 FIVB Men's Volleyball World Championship	30 Aug – 11 Sep 1966	Czechoslovakia	6	Czechoslovakia
1966 FIVB Men's Volleyball World Championship	30 Aug – 11 Sep 1966	Czechoslovakia	6	Romania
1966 FIVB Men's Volleyball World Championship	30 Aug – 11 Sep 1966	Czechoslovakia	6	Soviet Union
1966 FIVB Men's Volleyball World Championship	30 Aug – 11 Sep 1966	Czechoslovakia	6	East Germany
1966 FIVB Men's Volleyball World Championship	30 Aug – 11 Sep 1966	Czechoslovakia	6	Japan
1966 FIVB Men's Volleyball World Championship	30 Aug – 11 Sep 1966	Czechoslovakia	6	Poland
1967 Men's European Volleyball Championship	26 Oct – 8 Nov 1967	Turkey	6	Hungary
1967 Men's European Volleyball Championship	26 Oct – 8 Nov 1967	Turkey	6	Yugoslavia
1967 Men's European Volleyball Championship	26 Oct – 8 Nov 1967	Turkey	6	Italy
1967 Men's European Volleyball Championship	26 Oct – 8 Nov 1967	Turkey	6	France
1967 Men's European Volleyball Championship	26 Oct – 8 Nov 1967	Turkey	6	Israel
1967 Men's European Volleyball Championship	26 Oct – 8 Nov 1967	Turkey	6	Belgium
Volleyball at the 1966 Asian Games	10–19 December 1966	(Thailand) Bangkok	3	~~South Korea~~; Mongolia*
Volleyball at the 1966 Asian Games	10–19 December 1966	(Thailand) Bangkok	3	Iran
Volleyball at the 1966 Asian Games	10–19 December 1966	(Thailand) Bangkok	3	~~India~~; North Korea*
1969 Men's NORCECA Volleyball Championship	2–7 August 1969	Mexico City	2	Cuba
1969 Men's NORCECA Volleyball Championship	2–7 August 1969	Mexico City	2	~~Mexico~~; United States*
1969 Men's South American Volleyball Championship	15–24 August 1969	(Venezuela) Caracas	2	Brazil
1969 Men's South American Volleyball Championship	15–24 August 1969	(Venezuela) Caracas	2	Venezuela
1967 Men's African Volleyball Championship	July 1967	(Tunisia) Tunis	2	Tunisia
1967 Men's African Volleyball Championship	July 1967	(Tunisia) Tunis	2	~~Algeria~~; Guinea*
European Qualifier	13–17 September 1970	(Bulgaria) Sofia	2	Netherlands
European Qualifier	13–17 September 1970	(Bulgaria) Sofia	2	Finland
Total			24	

* South Korea, India, Mexico and Algeria were replaced by Mongolia, North Korea, United States and Guinea.

== Venues ==
Pool A and Final round	Pool B and Final round	1970 FIVB Men's Volleyball World Championship (Bulgaria)
Sofia, Bulgaria	Yambol, Bulgaria	1970 FIVB Men's Volleyball World Championship (Bulgaria)
Pool C and Final round	Pool D	1970 FIVB Men's Volleyball World Championship (Bulgaria)
Haskovo, Bulgaria	Kardzhali, Bulgaria	1970 FIVB Men's Volleyball World Championship (Bulgaria)

== Teams ==
Group A

- Belgium
- Bulgaria
- Italy
- Iran
- Israel
- Yugoslavia

Group B

- Brazil
- Czechoslovakia
- Finland
- Hungary
- Poland
- United States

Group C

- France
- Japan
- Netherlands
- North Korea
- Romania
- Venezuela

Group D

- Cuba
- East Germany
- Guinea
- Mongolia
- Soviet Union
- Tunisia

== Results ==
=== First round ===
==== Pool A ====
Location: Sofia

Pos	Team	Pld	W	L	Pts	SW	SL	SR	SPW	SPL	SPR	Qualification
1	Bulgaria	5	5	0	10	15	0	MAX	225	108	2.083	Final places
2	Belgium	5	4	1	9	12	4	3.000	210	156	1.346	Final places
3	Yugoslavia	5	3	2	8	9	10	0.900	230	223	1.031	9th–16th places
4	Italy	5	2	3	7	9	9	1.000	206	194	1.062	9th–16th places
5	Israel	5	1	4	6	3	12	0.250	142	199	0.714	17th–24th places
6	Iran	5	0	5	5	2	15	0.133	117	250	0.468	17th–24th places

Date	Time		Score		Set 1	Set 2	Set 3	Set 4	Set 5	Total
20 Sep	16:00	Yugoslavia	3–2	Iran	13–15	15–3	15–11	12–15	15–2	70–46
20 Sep	18:00	Bulgaria	3–0	Italy	15–6	15–7	15–8			45–21
20 Sep	20:00	Belgium	3–0	Israel	15–5	15–4	15–9			45–18
21 Sep	16:00	Yugoslavia	3–2	Italy	8–15	8–15	15–7	15–13	15–5	61–55
21 Sep	18:00	Bulgaria	3–0	Belgium	15–10	15–8	15–6			45–24
21 Sep	20:00	Israel	3–0	Iran	15–6	15–4	15–9			45–19
22 Sep	16:00	Yugoslavia	3–0	Israel	15–12	15–10	15–10			45–32
22 Sep	18:00	Bulgaria	3–0	Iran	15–4	15–5	15–3			45–12
22 Sep	20:00	Belgium	3–1	Italy	6–15	15–7	15–6	15–12		51–40
23 Sep	10:00	Italy	3–0	Israel	15–10	15–4	15–12			45–26
23 Sep	12:00	Belgium	3–0	Iran	15–11	15–5	15–13			45–29
23 Sep	20:00	Bulgaria	3–0	Yugoslavia	15–11	15–7	15–12			45–30
24 Sep	10:00	Italy	3–0	Iran	15–2	15–6	15–3			45–11
24 Sep	18:00	Bulgaria	3–0	Israel	15–5	15–4	15–8			45–21
24 Sep	20:00	Belgium	3–0	Yugoslavia	15–11	15–6	15–7			45–24

==== Pool B ====
Location: Yambol

Pos	Team	Pld	W	L	Pts	SW	SL	SR	SPW	SPL	SPR	Qualification
1	Czechoslovakia	5	5	0	10	15	2	7.500	280	192	1.458	Final places
2	Poland	5	4	1	9	12	8	1.500	310	259	1.197	Final places
3	Hungary	5	3	2	8	12	8	1.500	265	243	1.091	9th–16th places
4	Brazil	5	2	3	7	9	10	0.900	226	250	0.904	9th–16th places
5	United States	5	1	4	6	4	14	0.286	198	260	0.762	17th–24th places
6	Finland	5	0	5	5	5	15	0.333	210	285	0.737	17th–24th places

Date	Time		Score		Set 1	Set 2	Set 3	Set 4	Set 5	Total
20 Sep	16:00	Poland	3–1	Finland	13–15	15–9	15–6	15–7		58–37
20 Sep	18:00	Hungary	3–0	United States	15–12	16–14	15–6			46–32
20 Sep	20:00	Czechoslovakia	3–1	Brazil	15–13	15–5	15–17	15–4		60–39
21 Sep	16:00	United States	3–2	Finland	15–7	15–12	8–15	14–16	15–13	67–63
21 Sep	18:00	Poland	3–1	Brazil	15–11	15–12	13–15	15–6		58–44
21 Sep	20:00	Czechoslovakia	3–1	Hungary	10–15	15–11	15–11	15–7		55–44
22 Sep	16:00	Czechoslovakia	3–0	Finland	15–10	15–3	15–10			45–23
22 Sep	18:00	Poland	3–1	United States	15–11	17–15	13–15	15–6		60–47
22 Sep	20:00	Hungary	3–1	Brazil	15–7	15–13	14–16	15–6		59–42
23 Sep	16:00	Brazil	3–1	Finland	15–11	15–5	11–15	15–11		56–42
23 Sep	18:00	Poland	3–2	Hungary	15–11	11–15	15–10	13–15	15–6	69–57
23 Sep	20:00	Czechoslovakia	3–0	United States	15–5	16–14	15–2			46–21
24 Sep	16:00	Hungary	3–1	Finland	14–16	15–10	15–6	15–13		59–45
24 Sep	18:00	Brazil	3–0	United States	15–12	15–6	15–13			45–31
24 Sep	20:00	Czechoslovakia	3–2	Poland	15–13	16–18	13–15	15–6	15–13	74–65

==== Pool C ====
Location: Haskovo

Pos	Team	Pld	W	L	Pts	SW	SL	SR	SPW	SPL	SPR	Qualification
1	Japan	5	5	0	10	15	0	MAX	226	109	2.073	Final places
2	Romania	5	4	1	9	12	5	2.400	233	181	1.287	Final places
3	North Korea	5	2	3	7	8	9	0.889	199	187	1.064	9th–16th places
4	Netherlands	5	2	3	7	8	10	0.800	216	220	0.982	9th–16th places
5	France	5	2	3	7	6	12	0.500	197	244	0.807	17th–24th places
6	Venezuela	5	0	5	5	2	15	0.133	117	247	0.474	17th–24th places

Date	Time		Score		Set 1	Set 2	Set 3	Set 4	Set 5	Total
20 Sep	16:00	Netherlands	3–0	Venezuela	15–8	15–3	15–8			45–19
20 Sep	18:00	Romania	3–0	France	15–10	15–12	15–5			45–27
20 Sep	20:00	Japan	3–0	North Korea	15–6	15–12	15–7			45–25
21 Sep	16:00	France	3–1	Venezuela	15–6	15–7	13–15	15–11		58–39
21 Sep	18:00	Netherlands	3–1	North Korea	15–11	15–12	6–15	15–5		51–43
21 Sep	20:00	Japan	3–0	Romania	15–7	15–11	16–14			46–32
22 Sep	16:00	France	3–2	Netherlands	10–15	11–15	15–12	15–13	17–15	68–70
22 Sep	18:00	Japan	3–0	Venezuela	15–2	15–3	15–1			45–6
22 Sep	20:00	Romania	3–1	North Korea	15–9	12–15	15–6	15–11		57–41
23 Sep	16:00	Japan	3–0	France	15–7	15–5	15–9			45–21
23 Sep	18:00	North Korea	3–0	Venezuela	15–1	15–4	15–6			45–11
23 Sep	20:00	Romania	3–0	Netherlands	15–9	15–6	15–10			45–25
24 Sep	16:00	Japan	3–0	Netherlands	15–6	15–10	15–9			45–25
24 Sep	18:00	Romania	3–1	Venezuela	15–13	9–15	15–5	15–9		54–42
24 Sep	20:00	North Korea	3–0	France	15–5	15–5	15–13			45–23

==== Pool D ====
Location: Kardzhali

Pos	Team	Pld	W	L	Pts	SW	SL	SR	SPW	SPL	SPR	Qualification
1	East Germany	5	5	0	10	15	1	15.000	237	108	2.194	Final places
2	Soviet Union	5	4	1	9	13	3	4.333	220	97	2.268	Final places
3	Cuba	5	3	2	8	9	6	1.500	183	162	1.130	9th–16th places
4	Mongolia	5	1	4	6	5	13	0.385	186	249	0.747	9th–16th places
5	Tunisia	5	1	4	6	5	14	0.357	196	271	0.723	17th–24th places
6	Guinea	5	1	4	6	4	14	0.286	135	270	0.500	17th–24th places

Date	Time		Score		Set 1	Set 2	Set 3	Set 4	Set 5	Total
20 Sep	16:00	Soviet Union	3–0	Tunisia	15–3	15–1	15–0			45–4
20 Sep	18:00	Mongolia	3–1	Guinea	15–6	15–2	14–16	20–18		64–42
20 Sep	20:00	East Germany	3–0	Cuba	15–13	15–12	15–7			45–32
21 Sep	16:00	East Germany	3–0	Guinea	15–3	15–2	15–4			45–9
21 Sep	18:00	Soviet Union	3–0	Mongolia	15–4	15–8	15–5			45–17
21 Sep	20:00	Cuba	3–0	Tunisia	18–16	15–6	15–12			48–34
22 Sep	16:00	East Germany	3–1	Soviet Union	15–7	12–15	15–8	15–10		57–40
22 Sep	18:00	Tunisia	3–2	Mongolia	15–17	15–13	10–15	15–9	17–15	72–69
22 Sep	20:00	Cuba	3–0	Guinea	15–8	15–4	15–2			45–14
23 Sep	16:00	East Germany	3–0	Mongolia	15–6	15–5	15–1			45–12
23 Sep	18:00	Guinea	3–2	Tunisia	5–15	12–15	16–14	16–14	15–13	64–71
23 Sep	20:00	Soviet Union	3–0	Cuba	15–5	15–5	15–3			45–13
24 Sep	16:00	Soviet Union	3–0	Guinea	15–1	15–2	15–3			45–6
24 Sep	18:00	Cuba	3–0	Mongolia	15–8	15–9	15–7			45–24
24 Sep	20:00	East Germany	3–0	Tunisia	15–5	15–8	15–2			45–15

=== Final round ===
The results and the points of the matches between the same teams that were already played during the first round are taken into account for the final round.

==== 17th–24th places ====
Location: Haskovo

Pos	Team	Pld	W	L	Pts	SW	SL	SR	SPW	SPL	SPR
17	France	7	6	1	13	19	5	3.800	328	210	1.562
18	United States	7	6	1	13	19	9	2.111	382	311	1.228
19	Israel	7	4	3	11	15	10	1.500	276	245	1.127
20	Finland	7	4	3	11	15	11	1.364	329	282	1.167
21	Iran	7	4	3	11	14	12	1.167	304	314	0.968
22	Tunisia	7	2	5	9	8	17	0.471	258	297	0.869
23	Venezuela	7	1	6	8	6	18	0.333	258	340	0.759
24	Guinea	7	1	6	8	6	20	0.300	243	379	0.641

Date		Score		Set 1	Set 2	Set 3	Set 4	Set 5	Total
26 Sep	Venezuela	3–0	Guinea	15–13	15–11	15–5			45–29
26 Sep	Iran	3–0	Tunisia	15–7	15–13	15–13			45–33
26 Sep	Finland	3–2	Israel	15–12	4–15	15–9	14–16	15–8	63–60
26 Sep	United States	3–1	France	15–11	15–11	9–15	15–8		54–45
27 Sep	Finland	3–0	Tunisia	15–7	15–10	15–9			45–26
27 Sep	Israel	3–1	Guinea	17–15	15–8	15–17	15–1		62–41
27 Sep	United States	3–1	Venezuela	15–13	13–15	15–12	15–6		58–46
27 Sep	France	3–0	Iran	15–4	15–9	15–11			45–24
28 Sep	Finland	3–0	Guinea	15–7	15–6	15–0			45–13
28 Sep	France	3–0	Tunisia	15–8	15–4	15–5			45–17
28 Sep	Iran	3–0	Venezuela	15–6	15–9	15–12			45–27
28 Sep	United States	3–0	Israel	15–12	15–10	15–9			45–31
30 Sep	Tunisia	3–1	Venezuela	13–15	16–14	15–6	16–14		60–49
30 Sep	Iran	3–1	Finland	6–15	15–12	15–10	15–12		51–49
30 Sep	France	3–1	Israel	15–12	15–2	0–15	15–4		45–33
30 Sep	United States	3–0	Guinea	15–5	15–12	15–4			45–21
1 Oct	Tunisia	3–1	United States	6–15	15–12	15–10	15–12		51–49
1 Oct	Israel	3–0	Venezuela	15–12	15–8	15–12			45–32
1 Oct	Iran	3–2	Guinea	15–7	12–15	15–3	9–15	15–11	66–51
1 Oct	France	3–0	Finland	15–1	15–12	15–6			45–19
2 Oct	United States	3–2	Iran	15–8	7–15	12–15	15–9	15–7	64–54
2 Oct	France	3–0	Guinea	15–12	15–3	15–9			45–24
2 Oct	Finland	3–0	Venezuela	15–7	15–3	15–10			45–20
2 Oct	Israel	3–0	Tunisia						DNS

==== 9th–16th places ====
Location: Yambol

Pos	Team	Pld	W	L	Pts	SW	SL	SR	SPW	SPL	SPR
9	North Korea	7	6	1	13	19	7	2.714	359	272	1.320
10	Yugoslavia	7	5	2	12	16	11	1.455	325	320	1.016
11	Hungary	7	5	2	12	18	13	1.385	435	365	1.192
12	Brazil	7	4	3	11	15	13	1.154	362	306	1.183
13	Cuba	7	4	3	11	15	13	1.154	366	337	1.086
14	Netherlands	7	3	4	10	14	15	0.933	343	342	1.003
15	Italy	7	1	6	8	14	19	0.737	366	418	0.876
16	Mongolia	7	0	7	7	1	21	0.048	129	325	0.397

Date		Score		Set 1	Set 2	Set 3	Set 4	Set 5	Total
26 Sep	Brazil	3–0	Mongolia	15–8	15–7	15–3			45–18
26 Sep	Cuba	3–1	Netherlands	12–15	15–10	15–8	15–9		57–42
26 Sep	Hungary	3–2	Italy	15–8	15–4	12–15	13–15	15–12	70–54
26 Sep	North Korea	3–0	Yugoslavia	15–8	15–4	15–5			45–17
27 Sep	Hungary	3–2	Netherlands	7–15	15–13	15–9	15–17	15–10	67–64
27 Sep	North Korea	3–0	Mongolia	15–8	15–2	15–5			45–15
27 Sep	Yugoslavia	3–1	Cuba	15–12	4–15	15–9	17–15		51–51
27 Sep	Brazil	3–1	Italy	12–15	15–2	15–5	15–10		57–32
28 Sep	Yugoslavia	3–0	Mongolia	15–8	15–6	15–2			45–16
28 Sep	Hungary	3–2	Cuba	15–13	11–15	15–5	14–16	15–7	70–56
28 Sep	North Korea	3–2	Italy	15–5	15–7	12–15	15–17	15–13	72–57
28 Sep	Brazil	3–2	Netherlands	12–15	15–10	9–15	15–7	15–7	66–54
30 Sep	Italy	3–1	Mongolia	10–15	15–4	15–3	15–6		55–28
30 Sep	Cuba	3–1	Brazil	13–15	17–15	15–6	15–9		60–45
30 Sep	Yugoslavia	3–0	Netherlands	15–9	15–5	15–10			45–24
30 Sep	North Korea	3–1	Hungary	15–12	15–11	13–15	15–12		58–50
1 Oct	Cuba	3–2	Italy	13–15	15–6	17–15	7–15	15–8	67–59
1 Oct	Netherlands	3–0	Mongolia	15–2	15–5	15–3			45–10
1 Oct	Yugoslavia	3–2	Hungary	9–15	15–13	15–17	15–12	19–17	73–74
1 Oct	North Korea	3–1	Brazil	4–15	16–14	15–13	15–10		50–52
2 Oct	Netherlands	3–2	Italy	15–7	11–15	7–15	15–11	15–6	63–54
2 Oct	Hungary	3–0	Mongolia	15–13	15–3	15–2			45–18
2 Oct	North Korea	3–0	Cuba	16–14	15–11	15–5			46–30
2 Oct	Brazil	3–1	Yugoslavia	10–15	15–9	15–8	15–1		55–33

==== Final places ====
Venue: Festivalna Hall, Sofia

Pos	Team	Pld	W	L	Pts	SW	SL	SR	SPW	SPL	SPR
1	East Germany	7	6	1	13	20	6	3.333	358	270	1.326
2	Bulgaria	7	6	1	13	20	7	2.857	367	300	1.223
3	Japan	7	5	2	12	18	8	2.250	352	279	1.262
4	Czechoslovakia	7	4	3	11	13	11	1.182	322	313	1.029
5	Poland	7	3	4	10	10	16	0.625	325	364	0.893
6	Soviet Union	7	2	5	9	10	16	0.625	320	326	0.982
7	Romania	7	2	5	9	10	18	0.556	328	368	0.891
8	Belgium	7	0	7	7	2	21	0.095	183	335	0.546

Date	Time		Score		Set 1	Set 2	Set 3	Set 4	Set 5	Total
26 Sep	10:00	Soviet Union	3–0	Belgium	15–9	15–4	15–3			45–16
26 Sep	16:00	Czechoslovakia	3–2	Romania	7–15	10–15	15–13	15–10	15–6	62–59
26 Sep	18:00	Bulgaria	3–2	Japan	10–15	6–15	15–13	15–11	15–2	61–56
26 Sep	20:00	East Germany	3–0	Poland	15–9	15–8	15–12			45–29
27 Sep	10:00	Romania	3–1	Belgium	15–8	15–13	6–15	15–6		51–44
27 Sep	16:00	Soviet Union	3–1	Japan	16–14	15–12	9–15	15–8		55–49
27 Sep	18:00	Bulgaria	3–1	Poland	15–11	9–15	15–8	15–0		54–34
27 Sep	20:00	East Germany	3–0	Czechoslovakia	16–14	15–4	15–7			46–25
28 Sep	10:00	Japan	3–0	Poland	15–4	15–12	15–10			45–26
28 Sep	16:00	East Germany	3–0	Belgium	15–11	15–3	15–8			45–22
28 Sep	18:00	Bulgaria	3–1	Czechoslovakia	15–12	16–14	8–15	15–11		54–52
28 Sep	20:00	Romania	3–2	Soviet Union	15–8	18–16	11–15	4–15	15–7	63–61
30 Sep	10:00	Poland	3–1	Belgium	12–15	15–2	15–6	15–11		57–34
30 Sep	16:00	Japan	3–0	Czechoslovakia	15–9	15–5	15–5			45–19
30 Sep	18:00	Bulgaria	3–0	Soviet Union	16–14	15–13	16–14			47–41
30 Sep	20:00	East Germany	3–0	Romania	15–12	15–10	15-7			45–29
1 Oct	10:00	Czechoslovakia	3–0	Belgium	15–6	15–2	15–7			45–15
1 Oct	16:00	Japan	3–2	East Germany	15–13	15–9	13–15	6–15	15–6	64–58
1 Oct	18:00	Bulgaria	3–0	Romania	15–10	15–13	15–8			45–31
1 Oct	20:00	Poland	3–1	Soviet Union	15–12	15–12	4–15	15–10		49–49
2 Oct	10:00	Japan	3–0	Belgium	15–11	17–15	15–2			47–28
2 Oct	16:00	Poland	3–2	Romania	15–12	15–9	10–15	10–15	15–12	65–63
2 Oct	18:00	Czechoslovakia	3–0	Soviet Union	15–8	15–8	15–13			45–29
2 Oct	20:00	East Germany	3–2	Bulgaria	15–11	13–15	15–7	4–15	15–13	62–61

== Final standing ==
Rank	Team
1st place, gold medalist(s)	East Germany
2nd place, silver medalist(s)	Bulgaria
3rd place, bronze medalist(s)	Japan
4	Czechoslovakia
5	Poland
6	Soviet Union
7	Romania
8	Belgium
9	North Korea
10	Yugoslavia
11	Hungary
12	Brazil
13	Cuba
14	Netherlands
15	Italy
16	Mongolia
17	France
18	United States
19	Israel
20	Finland
21	Iran
22	Tunisia
23	Venezuela
24	Guinea

1970 Men's World champions

East Germany
1st title
