= Chinese Taipei men's national volleyball team =

Chinese Taipei
- Association: Chinese Taipei Volleyball Association (CTVBA)
- Confederation: AVC
- Head coach: Huang Hung-yu
- FIVB ranking: 54 ▲8 (1 October 2026)

Uniforms
Home	Away

World Championship
- Appearances: 1 (First in 1986)
- Best result: 15th (1986)

Asian Championship
- Appearances: 21 (First in 1983)
- Best result: 4th (1983, 1997, 2021)
- www.ctvba.org.tw (in Chinese)
Honours
Asian Games
Bronze medal – third place	1970 Bangkok	Team
Bronze medal – third place	1998 Bangkok	Team
Bronze medal – third place	2018 Jakarta-Palembang	Team
East Asian Championship
Gold medal – first place	2013 Taipei	Team
Silver medal – second place	2006 Pingtung	Team
Silver medal – second place	2008 Ulaanbaatar	Team
Silver medal – second place	2010 Jeju	Team
Silver medal – second place	2015 Ulaanbaatar	Team
Silver medal – second place	2017 Ulaanbaatar	Team
Silver medal – second place	2019 Zhangjiagang	Team
Silver medal – second place	2025 Zhangjiagang	Team
Bronze medal – third place	2004 Taicang	Team

The Chinese Taipei national volleyball team, governed by Chinese Taipei Volleyball Association, is the national volleyball team representing Taiwan in international competitions and friendly matches. (See Chinese Taipei for team naming issue)

In 2006 Asian Games, the team defeated Kuwait and Maldives in the first preliminary round, but in the second round they lost to Bahrain and were unable to enter quarter finals.

== Competition record ==
=== Olympic Games ===
- 1964 to 2024 – Did not qualify

=== World Championship ===
Champions Runners up Third place Fourth place

World Championship record
Year	Round	Position	GP	MW	ML	SW	SL
(Czechoslovakia) 1949	Did not enter or Did not qualify						
(Soviet Union) 1952	Did not enter or Did not qualify						
(France) 1956	Did not enter or Did not qualify						
(Brazil) 1960	Did not enter or Did not qualify						
(Soviet Union) 1962	Did not enter or Did not qualify						
(Czechoslovakia) 1966	Did not enter or Did not qualify						
(Bulgaria) 1970	Did not enter or Did not qualify						
(Mexico) 1974	Did not enter or Did not qualify						
(Italy) 1978	Did not enter or Did not qualify						
(Argentina) 1982	Did not enter or Did not qualify						
(France) 1986	13th–16th places	15th place	6	1	5	4	16
(Brazil) 1990	Did not qualify						
(Greece) 1994	Did not qualify						
(Japan) 1998	Did not qualify						
(Argentina) 2002	Did not qualify						
(Japan) 2006	Did not qualify						
(Italy) 2010	Did not qualify						
(Poland) 2014	Did not qualify						
(Italy) (Bulgaria) 2018	Did not qualify						
(Poland) (Slovenia) 2022	Did not qualify						
(Philippines) 2025	Did not qualify						
(Poland) 2027	To be determined						
(Qatar) 2029	To be determined						
Total	0 Title	1/23	6	1	5	4	16

=== World League ===
Champions Runners up Third place Fourth place

World League record
Year	Round	Position	GP	MW	ML	SW	SL
(Japan) 1990	Did not participate						
(Italy) 1991	Did not participate						
(Italy) 1992	Did not participate						
(Brazil) 1993	Did not participate						
(Italy) 1994	Did not participate						
(Brazil) 1995	Did not participate						
(Netherlands) 1996	Did not participate						
(Russia) 1997	Did not participate						
(Italy) 1998	Did not participate						
(Argentina) 1999	Did not participate						
(Netherlands) 2000	Did not participate						
(Poland) 2001	Did not participate						
(Brazil) 2002	Did not participate						
(Spain) 2003	Did not participate						
(Italy) 2004	Did not participate						
(Serbia and Montenegro) 2005	Did not participate						
(Russia) 2006	Did not participate						
(Poland) 2007	Did not participate						
(Brazil) 2008	Did not participate						
(Serbia) 2009	Did not participate						
(Argentina) 2010	Did not participate						
(Poland) 2011	Did not participate						
(Bulgaria) 2012	Did not participate						
(Argentina) 2013	Did not participate						
(Italy) 2014	Did not participate						
(Brazil) 2015	Did not participate						
(Poland) 2016	Group Final Round	28th place	8	4	4	14	15
(Brazil) 2017	G3 Group Stage	33rd place	6	2	4	12	14
Total	0 Title	2/28	14	6	8	26	29

=== AVC Continental Championship ===
Champions Runners up Third place Fourth place

AVC Continental Championship record
Year	Rank	Matches	W	L
(Australia) 1975	Did not enter			
(Bahrain) 1979	Did not enter			
(Japan) 1983	4	7	3	4
(Kuwait) 1987	6	8	5	3
(South Korea) 1989	9	8	6	2
(Australia) 1991	5	6	4	2
(Thailand) 1993	10	5	1	4
(South Korea) 1995	6	7	4	3
(Qatar) 1997	4	7	4	3
(Iran) 1999	7	7	3	4
(South Korea) 2001	6	6	3	3
(China) 2003	9	6	4	2
(Thailand) 2005	13	6	3	3
(Indonesia) 2007	8	9	3	6
(Philippines) 2009	8	7	2	5
(Iran) 2011	13	7	3	4
(United Arab Emirates) 2013	9	7	5	2
(Iran) 2015	6	8	4	4
(Indonesia) 2017	7	8	5	3
(Iran) 2019	5	8	5	3
(Japan) 2021	4	8	5	3
(Iran) 2023	6	4	2	2
(Japan) 2026	7	4	1	3
Total	21/23	143	75	68

=== Asian Games ===
Champions Runners up Third place Fourth place

Asian Games record
Year	Round	Position	GP	MW	ML	SW	SL
(Japan) 1958	Did not participate						
(Indonesia) 1962	Did not participate						
(Thailand) 1966	7th–12th place	7th place	8	6	2	20	7
(Thailand) 1970	Round robin	3rd place	6	4	2	N/A	N/A
(Iran) 1974	Did not participate						
(Thailand) 1978	Did not participate						
(India) 1982	Did not participate						
(South Korea) 1986	Did not participate						
(China) 1990	Did not participate						
(Japan) 1994	Did not participate						
(Thailand) 1998	Semifinals	3rd place	6	4	2	12	8
(South Korea) 2002	5th place match	6th place	5	2	3	10	9
(Qatar) 2006	Preliminary round	9th place	6	5	1	17	4
(China) 2010	11th place match	11th place	7	3	4	15	12
(South Korea) 2014	9th place match	9th place	7	5	2	15	9
(Indonesia) 2018	Semifinals	3rd place	5	3	2	13	8
(China) 2022	11th place match	11th place	4	2	2	8	7
(Japan) 2026	9th place match	9th place	6	4	2	15	9
Total	0 Title	10/18	60	38	22	125	73

=== AVC Cup ===
Champions Runners up Third place Fourth place

AVC Cup record
Year	Round	Position	GP	MW	ML	SW	SL	Squad
(Sri Lanka) 2018	Did not participate							
(Kyrgyzstan) 2022	Did not participate							
(Taiwan) 2023	9th–12th places	9th place	4	2	2	7	8	Squad
(Bahrain) 2024	9th–12th places	12th place	4	0	4	0	12	Squad
(Bahrain) 2025	5th–8th places	7th place	5	2	3	9	11	Squad
(India) 2026	7th place match	8th place	6	2	4	10	13	Squad
Total	0 Titles	4/6	19	6	13	26	44	—

=== Asian Cup ===
Champions Runners up Third place Fourth place

Asian Cup record (Defunct)
Year	Round	Position	GP	MW	ML	SW	SL
(Thailand) 2008	7th place match	7th place	6	2	4	9	13
(Iran) 2010	Semifinals	4th place	6	1	5	6	17
(Vietnam) 2012	Did not qualify						
(Kazakhstan) 2014	Did not qualify						
(Thailand) 2016	Semifinals	4th place	6	2	4	11	14
(Taiwan) 2018	Semifinals	4th place	6	3	3	12	12
(Thailand) 2022	Classification Pool G	9th place	4	2	2	7	6
Total	0 Title	5/7	28	10	18	45	62

=== East Asian Championship ===
Champions Runners up Third place Fourth place

East Asian Championship record
Year	Round	Position	GP	MW	ML	SW	SL	Squad
(Macau) 1998	Did not participate							
(Mongolia) 2000	Did not participate							
(China) 2002	Semifinals	4th place						
(China) 2004	Semifinals	3rd place						
(Taiwan) 2006	Round robin	Runners up						
(Mongolia) 2008	Final	Runners up						
(South Korea) 2010	Final	Runners up						
(Taiwan) 2013	Final	Champions						
(Mongolia) 2015	Final	Runners up						
(Mongolia) 2017	Final	Runners up						
(China) 2019	Round robin	Runners up	5	4	1	13	6	Squad
(China) 2025	Final	Runners up	4	2	2	8	8	Squad
Total	1 Title	10/12						—

== Team ==
=== Current squad ===
The following is the Chinese Taipei roster for the 2025 Asian Nations Cup.

Head coach: (Chinese Taipei) Huang Hung-yu

No.	Name	Date of birth	Pos.	Height	Weight	Spike	Block	Club
1	Chang Yu-chen (c)	May 22, 2002 (age 24)	OH	1.88 m (6 ft 2 in)	82 kg (181 lb)	320 cm (130 in)	310 cm (120 in)	
2	Chen Bo-xun	September 22, 2003 (age 23)	L	1.71 m (5 ft 7 in)	64 kg (141 lb)	275 cm (108 in)	270 cm (110 in)	
4	Wen Yi-kai	February 5, 2003 (age 23)	OH	1.87 m (6 ft 2 in)	78 kg (172 lb)	320 cm (130 in)	310 cm (120 in)	
5	Lin Chien	April 4, 2002 (age 24)	S	1.90 m (6 ft 3 in)	80 kg (180 lb)	320 cm (130 in)	310 cm (120 in)	
7	Chen Jie-ting	July 2, 2003 (age 23)	S	1.78 m (5 ft 10 in)	72 kg (159 lb)	295 cm (116 in)	285 cm (112 in)	
9	Kan Mao-hung	May 29, 2003 (age 23)	MB	1.91 m (6 ft 3 in)	84 kg (185 lb)	325 cm (128 in)	315 cm (124 in)	
11	Chen En-de	March 24, 2004 (age 22)	OP	1.90 m (6 ft 3 in)	90 kg (200 lb)	300 cm (120 in)	300 cm (120 in)	
12	Liu Yu-lin	December 3, 2003 (age 22)	OH	1.93 m (6 ft 4 in)	82 kg (181 lb)	325 cm (128 in)	315 cm (124 in)	
13	Hsu Rui-en	February 5, 2002 (age 24)	MB	1.94 m (6 ft 4 in)	81 kg (179 lb)	325 cm (128 in)	315 cm (124 in)	
14	Chang Yu-sheng	March 30, 2000 (age 26)	OP	1.88 m (6 ft 2 in)	82 kg (181 lb)	310 cm (120 in)	310 cm (120 in)	
15	Wang Ping-hsun	May 28, 2001 (age 25)	MB	1.90 m (6 ft 3 in)	80 kg (180 lb)	325 cm (128 in)	315 cm (124 in)	
16	Li Chun-yu	September 30, 2004 (age 22)	MB	1.88 m (6 ft 2 in)	77 kg (170 lb)	310 cm (120 in)	305 cm (120 in)	
19	Chen You-cheng	July 11, 2005 (age 21)	L	1.74 m (5 ft 9 in)	66 kg (146 lb)	290 cm (110 in)	280 cm (110 in)	
20	Li Yuan	July 17, 2004 (age 22)	OH	1.86 m (6 ft 1 in)	79 kg (174 lb)	320 cm (130 in)	310 cm (120 in)	

=== Former squads ===
The following was the Chinese Taipei roster in the men's volleyball tournament of the 2018 Asian Games.

Head coach: Chen Yuan

No.	Name	Date of birth	Height	Weight	Spike	Block	Club
1	Lin Cheng-yang	24 May 1993	1.94 m (6 ft 4 in)	83 kg (183 lb)	350 cm (140 in)	320 cm (130 in)	
2	Liu Hong-jie	10 November 1993	1.89 m (6 ft 2 in)	84 kg (185 lb)	327 cm (129 in)	320 cm (130 in)	(Japan) Wolfdog Nagoya
3	Li Chia-hsuan	6 September 1993	1.71 m (5 ft 7 in)	70 kg (150 lb)	300 cm (120 in)	270 cm (110 in)	
5	Huang Shih-hao	1 January 1991	1.83 m (6 ft 0 in)	85 kg (187 lb)	320 cm (130 in)	310 cm (120 in)	
6	Tai Ju-chien	14 November 1998	1.84 m (6 ft 0 in)	82 kg (181 lb)	320 cm (130 in)	310 cm (120 in)	(Chinese Taipei) Taichung Bank
7	Liu Hung-min	10 November 1993	1.90 m (6 ft 3 in)	86 kg (190 lb)	325 cm (128 in)	315 cm (124 in)	(Japan) Panasonic Panthers
10	Su Hou-chen	14 September 1995	1.80 m (5 ft 11 in)	82 kg (181 lb)	310 cm (120 in)	305 cm (120 in)	
11	Wu Tsung-hsuan	9 July 1994	1.86 m (6 ft 1 in)	80 kg (180 lb)	325 cm (128 in)	300 cm (120 in)	(Chinese Taipei) Taichung Bank
12	Hsu Mei-chung	16 October 1991	1.90 m (6 ft 3 in)	90 kg (200 lb)	333 cm (131 in)	300 cm (120 in)	(Chinese Taipei) Taichung Bank
13	Huang Chien-feng	31 December 1990	1.95 m (6 ft 5 in)	90 kg (200 lb)	345 cm (136 in)	332 cm (131 in)	(Chinese Taipei) Taichung Bank
14	Lin Yi-huei	19 February 1997	1.94 m (6 ft 4 in)	85 kg (187 lb)	333 cm (131 in)	320 cm (130 in)	
15	Wang Chien-pin	9 October 1989	1.85 m (6 ft 1 in)	80 kg (180 lb)	315 cm (124 in)	312 cm (123 in)	
16	Shih Hsiu-chih	24 July 1995	1.85 m (6 ft 1 in)	76 kg (168 lb)	320 cm (130 in)	310 cm (120 in)	
19	Chen Chien-chen (c)	20 November 1989	1.88 m (6 ft 2 in)	87 kg (192 lb)	338 cm (133 in)	325 cm (128 in)	(Chinese Taipei) Taichung Bank

The following was the Taiwanese roster in the 2017 World League.

Head coach: Yu Ching-fang

No.	Name	Date of birth	Height	Weight	Spike	Block	2016–17 club
1	Lin Kuo-chun	11 April 1993	1.89 m (6 ft 2 in)	72 kg (159 lb)	320 cm (130 in)	310 cm (120 in)	
2	Liu Hong-jie	10 November 1993	1.89 m (6 ft 2 in)	80 kg (180 lb)	327 cm (129 in)	320 cm (130 in)	(Chinese Taipei) Taichung Bank Club
3	Li Chia-hsuan	6 September 1993	1.70 m (5 ft 7 in)	66 kg (146 lb)	300 cm (120 in)	270 cm (110 in)	
5	Tung Li-yi	10 October 1994	1.65 m (5 ft 5 in)	62 kg (137 lb)	280 cm (110 in)	270 cm (110 in)	(Chinese Taipei) Taichung Bank Club
6	Tai Ju-chien	4 November 1988	1.81 m (5 ft 11 in)	77 kg (170 lb)	320 cm (130 in)	310 cm (120 in)	(Chinese Taipei) Taichung Bank Club
7	Liu Hung-min	10 November 1993	1.91 m (6 ft 3 in)	85 kg (187 lb)	325 cm (128 in)	315 cm (124 in)	
8	Chang Liang-hao	7 July 1994	1.94 m (6 ft 4 in)	86 kg (190 lb)	320 cm (130 in)	310 cm (120 in)	(Chinese Taipei) Taichung Bank Club
9	Yen Chen-fu	28 October 1997	1.98 m (6 ft 6 in)	82 kg (181 lb)	330 cm (130 in)	320 cm (130 in)	
10	Wu Tsung-hsuan	9 July 1994	1.85 m (6 ft 1 in)	75 kg (165 lb)	325 cm (128 in)	300 cm (120 in)	(Chinese Taipei) Taichung Bank Club
11	Lin Yi-huei	19 February 1997	1.95 m (6 ft 5 in)	80 kg (180 lb)	333 cm (131 in)	320 cm (130 in)	
12	Hsu Mei-chung	16 October 1991	1.88 m (6 ft 2 in)	90 kg (200 lb)	320 cm (130 in)	310 cm (120 in)	(Chinese Taipei) Taichung Bank Club
13	Huang Chien-feng	31 December 1990	1.95 m (6 ft 5 in)	82 kg (181 lb)	345 cm (136 in)	332 cm (131 in)	(Chinese Taipei) Taichung Bank Club
14	Wang Ming-chun	30 July 1988	1.88 m (6 ft 2 in)	85 kg (187 lb)	310 cm (120 in)	300 cm (120 in)	
15	Hsu Wen-chen	30 June 1996	1.88 m (6 ft 2 in)	73 kg (161 lb)	310 cm (120 in)	305 cm (120 in)	
16	Lee Hsing-kuo	20 September 1995	1.91 m (6 ft 3 in)	75 kg (165 lb)	315 cm (124 in)	295 cm (116 in)	
18	Shih Hsiu-chih	24 July 1995	1.84 m (6 ft 0 in)	77 kg (170 lb)	320 cm (130 in)	310 cm (120 in)	
19	Chen Chien-chen (C)	20 November 1989	1.88 m (6 ft 2 in)	87 kg (192 lb)	345 cm (136 in)	325 cm (128 in)	(Japan) JT Thunder
20	Chuang Shao-chieh	18 October 1994	1.94 m (6 ft 4 in)	80 kg (180 lb)	330 cm (130 in)	310 cm (120 in)	

== See also ==
- Chinese Taipei women's national volleyball team
