= North Korea men's national volleyball team =

National sports team

North Korea
- Association: The Volleyball Association of the D.P.R. Korea
- Confederation: AVC
- FIVB ranking: NR (5 October 2025)

Uniforms
Home
- www.fivb.org/EN/FIVB/Federation.asp?NF=PRK

The North Korea men's national volleyball team (recognized as DPR Korea by FIVB) represents North Korea in international volleyball competitions and friendly matches.
