= Portugal men's national under-19 volleyball team =

Portugal Boys' U19
- Association: Federação Portuguesa de Voleibol
- Confederation: CEV

Uniforms
Home	Away	Third

Youth Olympic Games
- Appearances: No Appearances

FIVB U19 World Championship
- Appearances: 2 (First in 1991)
- Best result: 4th place :(1993)

Europe U19 / U18 Championship
- Appearances: 2 (First in 1995)
- Best result: 8th place : (1995)
- www.fpvoleibol.pt (in Portuguese)

The Portugal men's national under-19 volleyball team represents Portugal in international men's volleyball competitions and friendly matches under the age 19 and it is ruled by the Federação Portuguesa de Voleibol body that is an affiliate of the Federation of International Volleyball FIVB and also part of the European Volleyball Confederation CEV.

== Results ==
=== Summer Youth Olympics ===
Champions Runners up Third place Fourth place

Youth Olympic Games
Year	Round	Position	Pld	W	L	SW	SL	Squad
(Singapore) 2010	Didn't qualify							
(China) 2014	No Volleyball Event							
(Argentina) 2018	No Volleyball Event							
Total	0 Titles	0/1						

=== FIVB U19 World Championship ===
Champions Runners up Third place Fourth place

FIVB U19 World Championship
Year	Round	Position	Pld	W	L	SW	SL	Squad
(United Arab Emirates) 1989	Didn't qualify							
(Portugal) 1991		9th place						
(Turkey) 1993		4th place						
(Puerto Rico) 1995	Didn't qualify							
(Iran) 1997	Didn't qualify							
(Saudi Arabia) 1999	Didn't qualify							
(Egypt) 2001	Didn't qualify							
(Thailand) 2003	Didn't qualify							
(Algeria) 2005	Didn't qualify							
(Mexico) 2007	Didn't qualify							
(Italy) 2009	Didn't qualify							
(Argentina) 2011	Didn't qualify							
(Mexico) 2013	Didn't qualify							
(Argentina) 2015	Didn't qualify							
(Bahrain) 2017	Didn't qualify							
(Tunisia) 2019	Didn't qualify							
(Iran) 2021	Didn't qualify							
(Argentina) 2023	Didn't qualify							
(Uzbekistan) 2025	Didn't qualify							
Total	0 Titles	2/19						

=== Europe U19 / U18 Championship ===
Champions Runners up Third place Fourth place

Europe U19 / U18 Championship
Year	Round	Position	Pld	W	L	SW	SL	Squad
(Spain) 1995		8th place						
(Slovakia) 1997	Didn't qualify							
(Poland) 1999	Didn't qualify							
(Czech Republic) 2001	Didn't qualify							
(Croatia) 2003	Didn't qualify							
(Latvia) 2005	Didn't qualify							
(Austria) 2007	Didn't qualify							
(Netherlands) 2009	Didn't qualify							
(Turkey) 2011	Didn't qualify							
(Bosnia and Herzegovina) / (Serbia) 2013	Didn't qualify							
(Turkey) 2015	Didn't qualify							
(Hungary) / (Slovakia) 2017	Didn't qualify							
(Czech Republic) / (Slovakia) 2018	Didn't qualify							
(Italy) 2020	Didn't qualify							
(Georgia (country)) 2022	Didn't qualify							
(Bulgaria) 2024		12th place						
(Italy) 2026	Didn't qualify							
Total	0 Titles	2/17						

== Team ==
=== Current squad ===
The following players are the Portuguese players that competed in the 2018 Boys' U18 Volleyball European Championship

#	name	position	height	weight	birthday	spike	block
	albuquerque pedro	setter	181	60	2001	289	274
	Assuncao antonio	setter	186	76	2001	295	281
	Bagorro jooa	middle-blocker	192	59	2001	300	289
	Cavalcanti gustavo	setter	183	63	2001	300	279
	Coelho joao	middle-blocker	191	79	2001	303	288
	Figueiredo manuel	outside-spiker	185	82	2003	293	280
	Francisco joao	outside-spiker	183	89	2002	294	280
	Leitao daniel	outside-spiker	189	68	2001	310	293
	Leite filipe	setter	188	91	2002	303	268
	Maranha francisco	outside-spiker	187	72	2001	315	305
	Marques nuno	outside-spiker	185	73	2003	300	285
	Moreira alexandre	middle-blocker	195	82	2001	302	284
	Neves jose afonso	middle-blocker	193	63	2001	305	289
	Oliveira bernardo	outside-spiker	188	77	2002	304	292
	Pereira tomas	opposite	185	68	2001	321	294
	Rodrigues francisco	libero	168	64	2001	290	275
	Sampaio marco	opposite	195	95	2001	310	300
	Santos francisco	outside-spiker	189	66	2001	313	296
	Santos rafael	outside-spiker	184	72	2001	329	290
	Soares joao	outside-spiker	186	68	2002	301	284
	Sousa goncalo	libero	175	75	2002	285	270
	Varela joao	middle-blocker	185	61	2002	247	280
	Vieira alexandre	opposite	193	81	2001	311	299
