= Italy men's national under-19 volleyball team =

Italy's national man U 19 volleyball team

Italy Boys' U19
- Association: FIPAV
- Confederation: CEV

Uniforms
Home	Away	Third

Youth Olympic Games
- Appearances: None

FIVB U19 World Championship
- Appearances: 12 (First in 1995)
- Best result: (gold) Champions : (1997, 2019)

Europe U19 / U18 Championship
- Appearances: 16 (First in 1995)
- Best result: (gold) Champions : (1997, 2020, 2022)

The Italy men's national under-19 volleyball team represents Italy in international men's volleyball competitions and friendly matches under the age 19 and it is ruled by the Italian Volleyball Federation body that is an affiliate of the Federation of International Volleyball FIVB and also part of the European Volleyball Confederation CEV.

== Results ==
=== Summer Youth Olympics ===
Champions Runners up Third place Fourth place

Youth Olympic Games
Year	Round	Position	Pld	W	L	SW	SL	Squad
(Singapore) 2010	Did not qualify							
(China) 2014	No Volleyball Event							
(Argentina) 2018	No Volleyball Event							
Total	0 Titles	0/1						

=== FIVB U19 World Championship ===
Champions Runners up Third place Fourth place

FIVB U19 World Championship
Year	Round	Position	Pld	W	L	SW	SL	Squad
(United Arab Emirates) 1989	Did not qualify							
(Portugal) 1991	Did not qualify							
(Turkey) 1993	Did not qualify							
(Puerto Rico) 1995		Runners-Up						Squad
(Iran) 1997		Champions						Squad
(Saudi Arabia) 1999	Did not qualify							
(Egypt) 2001		13th place						Squad
(Thailand) 2003		9th place						Squad
(Algeria) 2005		Third place						Squad
(Mexico) 2007	Did not qualify							
(Italy) 2009		8th place						Squad
(Argentina) 2011	Did not qualify							
(Mexico) 2013	Did not qualify							
(Argentina) 2015		5th place						Squad
(Bahrain) 2017		9th place						Squad
(Tunisia) 2019		Champions						Squad
(Iran) 2021		6th place						Squad
(Argentina) 2023		7th place						Squad
(Uzbekistan) 2025		5th place						Squad
Total	2 Titles	12/19						

=== Europe U19 / U18 Championship ===
Champions Runners up Third place Fourth place

Europe U19 / U18 Championship
Year	Round	Position	Pld	W	L	SW	SL	Squad
(Spain) 1995		Runners-Up						Squad
(Slovakia) 1997		Champions						Squad
(Poland) 1999		8th place						Squad
(Czech Republic) 2001		4th place						Squad
(Croatia) 2003		Third place						Squad
(Latvia) 2005		Third place						Squad
(Austria) 2007		8th place						Squad
(Netherlands) 2009		9th place						Squad
(Turkey) 2011	Did not qualify							
(Bosnia and Herzegovina) / (Serbia) 2013		7th place						Squad
(Turkey) 2015		Runners-Up						Squad
(Hungary) / (Slovakia) 2017		Runners-Up						Squad
(Czech Republic) / (Slovakia) 2018		Third place						Squad
(Italy) 2020		Champions						
(Georgia (country)) 2022		Champions						Squad
(Bulgaria) 2024		Runners-Up						Squad
(Italy) 2026		4th place						Squad
Total	3 Titles	16/17						

== Team ==
=== Current squad ===
The following is the Italian roster in the 2015 FIVB Volleyball Boys' U19 World Championship.

Head Coach: Mario Barbiero

No.	Name	Date of birth	Height	Weight	Spike	Block	2015 club
1	Pietro Margutti	20 April 1998	1.91 m (6 ft 3 in)	75 kg (165 lb)	334 cm (131 in)	300 cm (120 in)	(Italy) Club Italia Roma
2	Alessandro Piccinelli	30 January 1997	1.89 m (6 ft 2 in)	98 kg (216 lb)	315 cm (124 in)	290 cm (110 in)	(Italy) Volley Segrate
4	Edoardo Caneschi	26 January 1997	2.05 m (6 ft 9 in)	84 kg (185 lb)	348 cm (137 in)	325 cm (128 in)	(Italy) Club Italia Roma
5	Roberto Cominetti	20 April 1997	1.90 m (6 ft 3 in)	78 kg (172 lb)	335 cm (132 in)	315 cm (124 in)	(Italy) Vero Volley Monza
6	Riccardo Sbertoli	23 May 1998	1.88 m (6 ft 2 in)	85 kg (187 lb)	326 cm (128 in)	246 cm (97 in)	(Italy) Volley Segrate
7	Francesco Zoppellari	27 May 1997	1.85 m (6 ft 1 in)	79 kg (174 lb)	316 cm (124 in)	300 cm (120 in)	(Italy) Club Italia Roma
8	Paolo Zonca	13 May 1997	1.95 m (6 ft 5 in)	86 kg (190 lb)	336 cm (132 in)	315 cm (124 in)	(Italy) Club Italia Roma
9	Davide Cester	5 March 1997	1.96 m (6 ft 5 in)	90 kg (200 lb)	335 cm (132 in)	315 cm (124 in)	(Italy) Volley Treviso
10	Daniele Lavia	4 November 1999	1.98 m (6 ft 6 in)	81 kg (179 lb)	345 cm (136 in)	316 cm (124 in)	(Italy) Caffe' Aiello Corigliano
11	Gabriele Di Martino	20 July 1997	1.99 m (6 ft 6 in)	88 kg (194 lb)	340 cm (130 in)	320 cm (130 in)	(Italy) Club Italia Roma
12	Gianluca Galassi (C)	24 July 1997	2.01 m (6 ft 7 in)	94 kg (207 lb)	350 cm (140 in)	325 cm (128 in)	(Italy) Trentino Volley
15	Diego Cantagalli	13 February 1999	2.01 m (6 ft 7 in)	89 kg (196 lb)	348 cm (137 in)	310 cm (120 in)	(Italy) Lube Volley Treia
