= Romania men's national under-19 volleyball team =

Romania Boys' U19
- Association: Romanian Volleyball Federation
- Confederation: CEV

Uniforms
Home	Away	Third

Youth Olympic Games
- Appearances: No Appearances

FIVB U19 World Championship
- Appearances: No Appearances

Europe U19 / U18 Championship
- Appearances: 4 (First in 2015)
- Best result: 9th place : (2017)
- Official website

The Romania men's national under-19 volleyball team represents Romania in international men's volleyball competitions and friendly matches under the age 19 and it is ruled by the Romanian Volleyball Federation body that is an affiliate of the Federation of International Volleyball FIVB and also part of the European Volleyball Confederation CEV.

== Results ==
=== Summer Youth Olympics ===
Champions Runners up Third place Fourth place

Youth Olympic Games
Year	Round	Position	Pld	W	L	SW	SL	Squad
(Singapore) 2010	Didn't qualify							
(China) 2014	No Volleyball Event							
(Argentina) 2018	No Volleyball Event							
Total	0 Titles	0/1						

=== FIVB U19 World Championship ===
Champions Runners up Third place Fourth place

FIVB U19 World Championship
Year	Round	Position	Pld	W	L	SW	SL	Squad
(United Arab Emirates) 1989	Didn't qualify							
(Portugal) 1991	Didn't qualify							
(Turkey) 1993	Didn't qualify							
(Puerto Rico) 1995	Didn't qualify							
(Iran) 1997	Didn't qualify							
(Saudi Arabia) 1999	Didn't qualify							
(Egypt) 2001	Didn't qualify							
(Thailand) 2003	Didn't qualify							
(Algeria) 2005	Didn't qualify							
(Mexico) 2007	Didn't qualify							
(Italy) 2009	Didn't qualify							
(Argentina) 2011	Didn't qualify							
(Mexico) 2013	Didn't qualify							
(Argentina) 2015	Didn't qualify							
(Bahrain) 2017	Didn't qualify							
(Tunisia) 2019	Didn't qualify							
(Iran) 2021	Didn't qualify							
(Argentina) 2023	Didn't qualify							
(Uzbekistan) 2025	Didn't qualify							
Total	0 Titles	0/19						

=== Europe U19 / U18 Championship ===
Champions Runners up Third place Fourth place

Europe U19 / U18 Championship
Year	Round	Position	Pld	W	L	SW	SL	Squad
(Spain) 1995	Didn't qualify							
(Slovakia) 1997	Didn't qualify							
(Poland) 1999	Didn't qualify							
(Czech Republic) 2001	Didn't qualify							
(Croatia) 2003	Didn't qualify							
(Latvia) 2005	Didn't qualify							
(Austria) 2007	Didn't qualify							
(Netherlands) 2009	Didn't qualify							
(Turkey) 2011	Didn't qualify							
(Bosnia and Herzegovina) / (Serbia) 2013	Didn't qualify							
(Turkey) 2015		12th place						
(Hungary) / (Slovakia) 2017		9th place						
(Czech Republic) / (Slovakia) 2018	Didn't qualify							
(Italy) 2020	Didn't qualify							
(Georgia (country)) 2022	Didn't qualify							
(Bulgaria) 2024		15th						
(Italy) 2026		13th						
Total	0 Titles	4/17						

== Team ==
=== Current squad ===
The following players are the Romanian players that have competed in the 2018 Boys' U18 Volleyball European Championship

#	name	position	height	weight	birthday	spike	block
	Arion Teodor	libero	165	55	2002	250	243
	Badea Cristian	outside-spiker	196	76	2001	320	300
	Catana Bogdan Ionut	outside-spiker	186	70	2001	320	305
	Chicu Laurentiu	setter	187	70	2001	310	295
	Cirloganescu Andrei	middle-blocker	198	78	2002	335	330
	Cojocariu Madalin Florin	opposite	188	77	2002	315	300
	Constantinescu Tudor	setter	182	70	2002	305	293
	Cozma Sebastian	setter	190	80	2001	315	300
	Darie Nicolae Radu	outside-spiker	186	70	2001	320	300
	Dragan Emanuel Cristian	middle-blocker	193	76	2001	310	305
	Druta Andrei Bogdan	opposite	192	73	2002	315	300
	Holota Adrian	middle-blocker	193	75	2001	328	315
	Marginean Sebastian Constantin	opposite	196	80	2002	335	330
	Nastase Razvan Nicusor	outside-spiker	186	70	2002	320	315
	Pop Gabriel Ionut	outside-spiker	193	75	2001	320	298
	Purcaru Eduard Stefan	setter	183	68	2001	310	295
	Salatioan Michael Christian	outside-spiker	187	70	2001	320	300
	Savoiu Costin Adrian	libero	174	58	2003	290	280
	Schiopu David Andrei	outside-spiker	191	77	2002	325	315
