= Turkey men's national under-19 volleyball team =

National U-19 men's volleyball team of Republic of Türkiye

Turkey Boys' U19
- Association: Turkish Volleyball Federation
- Confederation: CEV

Uniforms
Home	Away	Third

Youth Olympic Games
- Appearances: None

FIVB U19 World Championship
- Appearances: 5 (First in 1993)
- Best result: 9th Place : (1993, 2015)

Europe U19 / U18 Championship
- Appearances: 9 (First in 2007)
- Best result: (bronze) Bronze : (2015, 2017)

The Turkey men's national under-19 volleyball team represents Turkey in international men's volleyball competitions and friendly matches under the age 19. The team is governed by the Turkish Volleyball Federation, a body that is an affiliate of the Federation of International Volleyball FIVB and also part of the European Volleyball Confederation CEV.

== Results ==
=== Summer Youth Olympics ===
Champions Runners up Third place Fourth place

Youth Olympic Games
Year	Round	Position	Pld	W	L	SW	SL	Squad
(Singapore) 2010	Didn't qualify							
(China) 2014	No Volleyball Event							
(Argentina) 2018	No Volleyball Event							
Total	0 Titles	0/1						

=== FIVB U19 World Championship ===
Champions Runners up Third place Fourth place

FIVB U19 World Championship
Year	Round	Position	Pld	W	L	SW	SL	Squad
(United Arab Emirates) 1989	Didn't qualify							
(Portugal) 1991	Didn't qualify							
(Turkey) 1993		9th place						
(Puerto Rico) 1995	Didn't qualify							
(Iran) 1997	Didn't qualify							
(Saudi Arabia) 1999	Didn't qualify							
(Egypt) 2001	Didn't qualify							
(Thailand) 2003	Didn't qualify							
(Algeria) 2005	Didn't qualify							
(Mexico) 2007	Didn't qualify							
(Italy) 2009	Didn't qualify							
(Argentina) 2011	Didn't qualify							
(Mexico) 2013		15th place	8	2	6	12	19	Squad
(Argentina) 2015		9th place	8	5	3	16	15	Squad
(Bahrain) 2017		11th place	8	4	4	15	15	Squad
(Tunisia) 2019	Didn't Qualify							
(Iran) 2021	Didn't Qualify							
(Argentina) 2023	Didn't Qualify							
(Uzbekistan) 2025		20th place	8	2	6	11	20	Squad
Total	-	5/19	32	13	19	54	69	-

=== Europe U19 / U18 Championship ===
Champions Runners up Third place Fourth place

Europe U19 / U18 Championship
Year	Round	Position	Pld	W	L	SW	SL	Squad
(Spain) 1995	Didn't qualify							
(Slovakia) 1997	Didn't qualify							
(Poland) 1999	Didn't qualify							
(Czech Republic) 2001	Didn't qualify							
(Croatia) 2003	Didn't qualify							
(Latvia) 2005	Didn't qualify							
(Austria) 2007		9th place						Squad
(Netherlands) 2009	Didn't qualify							
(Turkey) 2011		8th place						Squad
(Bosnia and Herzegovina) / (Serbia) 2013		5th place						Squad
(Turkey) 2015		Third place						Squad
(Hungary) / (Slovakia) 2017		Third place						Squad
(Czech Republic) / (Slovakia) 2018		9th place						Squad
(Italy) 2020		7th place						Squad
(Georgia (country)) 2022	Didn't qualify							
(Bulgaria) 2024		7th place						Squad
(Italy) 2026		14th place						Squad
Total	0 Titles	9/17						

== Team ==
=== Current squad ===
The following is the Turkish roster in the 2015 FIVB Volleyball Boys' U19 World Championship.

Head Coach: Salih Erdogan Tavaci

No.	Name	Date of birth	Height	Weight	Spike	Block	2015 club
1	Ali Onur Edis	18 January 1997	1.97 m (6 ft 6 in)	85 kg (187 lb)	328 cm (129 in)	318 cm (125 in)	(Turkey) Beşiktaş
2	Muzaffer Yönet (C)	18 June 1997	1.90 m (6 ft 3 in)	70 kg (150 lb)	318 cm (125 in)	300 cm (120 in)	(Turkey) Arkas
4	Ogulcan Yatgin	28 April 1997	1.97 m (6 ft 6 in)	87 kg (192 lb)	320 cm (130 in)	309 cm (122 in)	(Turkey) Fenerbahçe
6	Çam Abdullah	30 March 1997	1.95 m (6 ft 5 in)	80 kg (180 lb)	316 cm (124 in)	300 cm (120 in)	(Turkey) Halkbank
9	Halil Ibrahim Kurt	16 February 1998	2.03 m (6 ft 8 in)	90 kg (200 lb)	323 cm (127 in)	311 cm (122 in)	(Turkey) Fenerbahçe
10	Özgür Türkmen	22 January 1998	1.90 m (6 ft 3 in)	75 kg (165 lb)	325 cm (128 in)	312 cm (123 in)	(Turkey) Galatasaray
11	Ugur Kilinç	24 January 1997	2.02 m (6 ft 8 in)	95 kg (209 lb)	325 cm (128 in)	315 cm (124 in)	(Turkey) Arkas
12	Burakhan Tosun	17 January 1998	2.02 m (6 ft 8 in)	93 kg (205 lb)	335 cm (132 in)	316 cm (124 in)	(Turkey) Fenerbahçe
14	Berkay Bayraktar	3 July 1998	1.90 m (6 ft 3 in)	76 kg (168 lb)	320 cm (130 in)	310 cm (120 in)	(Turkey) Tofaş
15	Adis Lagumdzija	19 March 1999	2.04 m (6 ft 8 in)	96 kg (212 lb)	330 cm (130 in)	310 cm (120 in)	(Turkey) Galatasaray
16	Furkan Cöne	22 March 1997	1.80 m (5 ft 11 in)	68 kg (150 lb)	310 cm (120 in)	295 cm (116 in)	(Turkey) Istanbul Büyüksehir Belediye
19	Oguzhan Dogruluk	1 January 1998	1.98 m (6 ft 6 in)	90 kg (200 lb)	325 cm (128 in)	310 cm (120 in)	(Turkey) Ziraat Bankası

== See also ==
  - Men's
- Turkey Men's national volleyball team
- Turkey Men's national volleyball team U23
- Turkey Men's national volleyball team U21
- Turkey Men's national volleyball team U19
  - Women's
- Turkey Women's national volleyball team
- Turkey Women's national volleyball team U23
- Turkey Women's national volleyball team U20
- Turkey Women's national volleyball team U18
