= France men's national under-19 volleyball team =

Youth volleyball team representing France

France Boys' U19
- Association: French Volleyball Federation
- Confederation: CEV

Uniforms
Home	Away	Third

Youth Olympic Games
- Appearances: None

FIVB U19 World Championship
- Appearances: 15 (First in 1989)
- Best result: (gold) Champions : (2023,2025)

Europe U19 / U18 Championship
- Appearances: 15 (First in 1995)
- Best result: (gold) Champions : (2007, 2009, 2024)
- French Volleyball Federation (in French)

The France men's national under-19 volleyball team represents France in international men's volleyball competitions and friendly matches under the age 19 and it is ruled by the French Volleyball Federation body that is an affiliate of the Federation of International Volleyball FIVB and also part of the European Volleyball Confederation CEV. World number one under the aegis of the FIVB from 2023 to 2025.

== Results ==
=== Summer Youth Olympics ===
Champions Runners up Third place Fourth place

Youth Olympic Games
Year	Round	Position	Pld	W	L	SW	SL	Squad
(Singapore) 2010	Didn't qualify							
(China) 2014	No Volleyball Event							
(Argentina) 2018	No Volleyball Event							
Total	0 Titles	0/1						

=== FIVB U19 World Championship ===
Champions Runners up Third place Fourth place

FIVB U19 World Championship
Year	Round	Position	Pld	W	L	SW	SL	Squad
(United Arab Emirates) 1989		9th place						
(Portugal) 1991		7th place						
(Turkey) 1993	Didn't qualify							
(Puerto Rico) 1995		11th place						
(Iran) 1997		7th place						Squad
(Saudi Arabia) 1999		9th place						Squad
(Egypt) 2001		7th place						Squad
(Thailand) 2003	Didn't qualify							
(Algeria) 2005		6th place						Squad
(Mexico) 2007		Third place						Squad
(Italy) 2009		12th place						Squad
(Argentina) 2011		4th place						Squad
(Mexico) 2013		8th place						Squad
(Argentina) 2015		11th place						Squad
(Bahrain) 2017		5th place						Squad
(Tunisia) 2019	Didn't Qualify							
(Iran) 2021	Didn't Qualify							
(Argentina) 2023		Champions						
(Uzbekistan) 2025		Champions						
Total	2 Title	15/18						

=== Europe U19 / U18 Championship ===
Champions Runners up Third place Fourth place

Europe U19 / U18 Championship
Year	Round	Position	Pld	W	L	SW	SL	Squad
(Spain) 1995		4th place						Squad
(Slovakia) 1997		5th place						Squad
(Poland) 1999		7th place						Squad
(Czech Republic) 2001		Third place						Squad
(Croatia) 2003	Didn't qualify							
(Latvia) 2005		Runners-up						Squad
(Austria) 2007		Champions						Squad
(Netherlands) 2009		Champions						Squad
(Turkey) 2011		Runners-up						Squad
(Bosnia and Herzegovina) / (Serbia) 2013		6th place						Squad
(Turkey) 2015		9th place						Squad
(Hungary) / (Slovakia) 2017		6th place						Squad
(Czech Republic) / (Slovakia) 2018		8th place						Squad
(Italy) 2020	Did not enter							
(Georgia (country)) 2022		Runners-up						Squad
(Bulgaria) 2024		Champions						Squad
(Italy) 2026		Runners-up						Squad
Total	3 Titles	15/17						

== Team ==
=== Current squad ===
The following is the French roster in the 2015 FIVB Volleyball Boys' U19 World Championship.

Head Coach: Olivier Audabram

No.	Name	Date of birth	Height	Weight	Spike	Block	2015 club
1	Barthélémy Chinenyeze	28 February 1998	2.00 m (6 ft 7 in)	80 kg (180 lb)	345 cm (136 in)	320 cm (130 in)	(France) Dunkerque GL VB
4	Toky Rojoharivelo	4 May 1997	1.90 m (6 ft 3 in)	90 kg (200 lb)	333 cm (131 in)	314 cm (124 in)	(France) US St Egrevoise
7	Luc Parville	22 May 1997	1.70 m (5 ft 7 in)	65 kg (143 lb)	310 cm (120 in)	295 cm (116 in)	(France) Tourcoing VB LM
8	Joachim Panou (C)	27 August 1997	1.98 m (6 ft 6 in)	89 kg (196 lb)	345 cm (136 in)	318 cm (125 in)	(France) US Mulhousienne
11	Thibaut Thoral	3 January 1997	1.92 m (6 ft 4 in)	85 kg (187 lb)	340 cm (130 in)	315 cm (124 in)	(France) Tourcoing VB LM
12	Fran Novotni	22 February 1997	1.97 m (6 ft 6 in)	84 kg (185 lb)	345 cm (136 in)	324 cm (128 in)	(France) Nice VB
13	Killian Weidner	17 April 1997	2.03 m (6 ft 8 in)	88 kg (194 lb)	335 cm (132 in)	314 cm (124 in)	(France) Arago de Sète
14	Benjamin Diez	4 April 1998	1.83 m (6 ft 0 in)	75 kg (165 lb)	325 cm (128 in)	305 cm (120 in)	(France) AS Cannes
15	Léo Meyer	25 January 1997	1.94 m (6 ft 4 in)	83 kg (183 lb)	340 cm (130 in)	315 cm (124 in)	(France) US Mulhousienne
16	Mathieu Manusauaki	14 November 1997	1.94 m (6 ft 4 in)	102 kg (225 lb)	345 cm (136 in)	320 cm (130 in)	(France) SA Mérignac
19	Titouan Halle	22 February 1998	1.94 m (6 ft 4 in)	81 kg (179 lb)	340 cm (130 in)	315 cm (124 in)	(France) Rennes EC
20	Léo Chevalier	11 January 1997	1.93 m (6 ft 4 in)	85 kg (187 lb)	345 cm (136 in)	320 cm (130 in)	(France) Montpellier
