= Spain men's national under-19 volleyball team =

Spain Boys' U19
- Association: Spanish Volleyball Federation
- Confederation: CEV

Uniforms
Home	Away	Third

Youth Olympic Games
- Appearances: No Appearances

FIVB U19 World Championship
- Appearances: 4 (First in 1995)
- Best result: (silver) Runners-up : (2011)

Europe U19 / U18 Championship
- Appearances: 7 (First in 1995)
- Best result: 4th place : (2024)
- www.rfevb.com (in Spanish)

The Spain men's national under-19 volleyball team represents Spain in international men's volleyball competitions and friendly matches under the age 19 and it is ruled by the Real Federación Española de Voleibol body that is an affiliate of the Federation of International Volleyball FIVB and also part of the European Volleyball Confederation CEV.

== Results ==
=== Summer Youth Olympics ===
Champions Runners up Third place Fourth place

Youth Olympic Games
Year	Round	Position	Pld	W	L	SW	SL	Squad
(Singapore) 2010	Did not qualify							
(China) 2014	No Volleyball Event							
(Argentina) 2018	No Volleyball Event							
Total	0 Titles	0/1						

=== FIVB U19 World Championship ===
Champions Runners up Third place Fourth place

FIVB U19 World Championship
Year	Round	Position	Pld	W	L	SW	SL	Squad
(United Arab Emirates) 1989	Did not qualify							
(Portugal) 1991	Did not qualify							
(Turkey) 1993	Did not qualify							
(Puerto Rico) 1995		9th place						
(Iran) 1997	Did not qualify							
(Saudi Arabia) 1999	Did not qualify							
(Egypt) 2001	Did not qualify							
(Thailand) 2003	Did not qualify							
(Algeria) 2005	Did not qualify							
(Mexico) 2007	Did not qualify							
(Italy) 2009		5th place						
(Argentina) 2011		Runners-up						
(Mexico) 2013	Did not qualify							
(Argentina) 2015	Did not qualify							
(Bahrain) 2017	Did not qualify							
(Tunisia) 2019	Did not qualify							
(Iran) 2021	Did not qualify							
(Argentina) 2023	Did not qualify							
(Uzbekistan) 2025		3rd place						
Total	0 Titles	4/18						

=== Europe U19 / U18 Championship ===
Champions Runners up Third place Fourth place

Europe U19 / U18 Championship
Year	Round	Position	Pld	W	L	SW	SL	Squad
(Spain) 1995		6th place						
(Slovakia) 1997	Did not qualify							
(Poland) 1999	Did not qualify							
(Czech Republic) 2001	Did not qualify							
(Croatia) 2003	Did not qualify							
(Latvia) 2005		12th place						
(Austria) 2007	Did not qualify							
(Netherlands) 2009		5th place						
(Turkey) 2011		5th place						
(Bosnia and Herzegovina) / (Serbia) 2013	Did not qualify							
(Turkey) 2015		10th place						
(Hungary) / (Slovakia) 2017	Did not qualify							
(Czech Republic) / (Slovakia) 2018	Did not qualify							
(Italy) 2020	Did not qualify							
(Georgia (country)) 2022	Did not qualify							
(Bulgaria) 2024		4th place						
(Italy) 2026		6th place						
Total	0 Titles	7/17						

== Team ==
=== Current squad ===
The following players are the Spanish players that have competed in the 2018 Boys' U18 Volleyball European Championship

#	name	position	height	weight	birthday	spike	block
1	Mena Romero Pau	opposite	194	74	26 January 2001	300	315
1	Piris Guiscafré Antoni	outside-spiker	183	72	30 August 2001	320	310
2	Folgueira Fernández Iago	middle-blocker	195	79	15 November 2001	325	315
3	Garcia de Andrade Juan Gregorio	outside-spiker	189	70	21 February 2003	305	295
4	Campos Canals Miquel	middle-blocker	196	67	28 November 2001	324	318
5	Mateu Tena Álvaro	libero	179	62	13 January 2001	280	270
6	Alonso Marino Javier	outside-spiker	191	75	3 May 2001	320	314
7	Ferrández Moles Emilio	outside-spiker	192	70	4 June 2001	328	320
8	Cuquerella Gilabert Borja	middle-blocker	193	75	22 October 2001	320	316
9	Mellado García Pablo	libero	175	73	6 July 2002	290	280
10	Ferrari Puga Diego	opposite	194	70	4 July 2001	320	314
11	Salmerón Saiz Guillermo	opposite	191	74	28 November 2003	295	285
12	Costa Arnau Álvaro	setter	183	70	28 November 2002	306	300
13	Olalla Gómez Adrián	outside-spiker	195	65	7 August 2001	328	320
14	Micó Bladrés Víctor	setter	77	186	26 August 2001	314	308
15	González Plaza Miguel	outside-spiker	193	67	5 May 2002	300	290
17	Masiá Porres Arnau	libero	182	75	4 April 2002	295	280
18	Peña Hernández Mario	setter	178	65	28 November 2002	304	296
19	Domenech Tous Joan	middle-blocker	203	73	30 September 2001	310	300
20	Galvis Mejía Brian Johan	outside-spiker	60	183	13 September 2002	316	310
21	Losada Gordaliza Roi	setter	178	65	6 March 2003	285	275
22	Lorente Lopez Lucas	setter	186	74	27 December 2001	300	290
