= Greece men's national under-19 volleyball team =

Greece Boys' U19
- Association: Hellenic Volleyball Federation
- Confederation: CEV

Uniforms
Home	Away	Third

Youth Olympic Games
- Appearances: No Appearances

FIVB U19 World Championship
- Appearances: 3 (First in 1993)
- Best result: (silver) Runners-up : (1997)

Europe U19 / U18 Championship
- Appearances: 6 (First in 1997)
- Best result: (silver) Runners-up : (1997)
- Official Website

The Greece men's national under-19 volleyball team represents Greece in international men's volleyball competitions and friendly matches under the age 19 and it is ruled by the Hellenic Volleyball Federation body that is an affiliate of the Federation of International Volleyball FIVB and also part of the European Volleyball Confederation CEV.

== Results ==
=== Summer Youth Olympics ===
Champions Runners up Third place Fourth place

Youth Olympic Games
Year	Round	Position	Pld	W	L	SW	SL	Squad
(Singapore) 2010	Didn't qualify							
(China) 2014	No Volleyball Event							
(Argentina) 2018	No Volleyball Event							
Total	0 Titles	0/1						

=== FIVB U19 World Championship ===
Champions Runners up Third place Fourth place

FIVB U19 World Championship
Year	Round	Position	Pld	W	L	SW	SL	Squad
(United Arab Emirates) 1989	Didn't qualify							
(Portugal) 1991	Didn't qualify							
(Turkey) 1993		5th place						
(Puerto Rico) 1995	Didn't qualify							
(Iran) 1997		Runners-up						
(Saudi Arabia) 1999	Didn't qualify							
(Egypt) 2001	Didn't qualify							
(Thailand) 2003	Didn't qualify							
(Algeria) 2005	Didn't qualify							
(Mexico) 2007	Didn't qualify							
(Italy) 2009	Didn't qualify							
(Argentina) 2011		7th place						
(Mexico) 2013	Didn't qualify							
(Argentina) 2015	Didn't qualify							
(Bahrain) 2017	Didn't qualify							
(Tunisia) 2019	Didn't qualify							
(Iran) 2021	Didn't qualify							
(Argentina) 2023	Didn't qualify							
(Uzbekistan) 2025	Didn't qualify							
Total	0 Titles	3/19						

=== Europe U19 / U18 Championship ===
Champions Runners up Third place Fourth place

Europe U19 / U18 Championship
Year	Round	Position	Pld	W	L	SW	SL	Squad
(Spain) 1995	Didn't qualify							
(Slovakia) 1997		Runners-up						
(Poland) 1999	Didn't qualify							
(Czech Republic) 2001	Didn't qualify							
(Croatia) 2003	Didn't qualify							
(Latvia) 2005	Didn't qualify							
(Austria) 2007	Didn't qualify							
(Netherlands) 2009	Didn't qualify							
(Turkey) 2011		6th place						
(Bosnia and Herzegovina) / (Serbia) 2013	Didn't qualify							
(Turkey) 2015	Didn't qualify							
(Hungary) / (Slovakia) 2017	Didn't qualify							
(Czech Republic) / (Slovakia) 2018		11th place						
(Italy) 2020	Did not enter							
(Georgia (country)) 2022		9th place						
(Bulgaria) 2024		11th place						
(Italy) 2026		8th place						
Total	0 Titles	6/17						

== Team ==
=== Current squad ===
The following players are the Greek players that have competed in the 2018 Boys' U18 Volleyball European Championship

#	name	position	height	weight	birthday	spike	block
	andreopoulos charalampos	outside-spiker	188	76	2001	311	287
	Bozidis panagiotis	setter	180	75	2002	302	297
	Chakas spyridon	outside-spiker	187	66	2002	317	312
	Chandrinos aristeidis	libero	182	68	2002	311	306
	Chandrinos spyridon	outside-spiker	186	71	2001	312	307
	Dimitriadis dimitrios	middle-blocker	195	84	2001	324	305
	Dimo ilia	outside-spiker	204	90	2001	315	288
	Dordokidis theodoros	middle-blocker	190	70	2001	322	317
	Giamakidis kiosses christos	setter	187	77	2002	305	300
	Iliakopoulos nikolaos	setter	189	79	2001	312	307
	Kanellopoulos kotsonis evangelos	outside-spiker	188	75	2002	305	286
	Kantaridis athanasios	outside-spiker	181	75	2001	317	312
	Kesesidis athanasios	middle-blocker	191	79	2001	312	307
	Kesoudis evangelos	outside-spiker	184	70	2001	311	306
	Komitoudis charalampos	outside-spiker	188	78	2001	315	310
	Koutsogiannos konstantinos	middle-blocker	191	77	2001	313	308
	Mantzios iasonas	outside-spiker	188	76	2001	310	305
	Mouchlias dimitrios	opposite	198	70	2001	313	283
	Papadimitriou charalampos	outside-spiker	183	70	2001	311	306
	Papazoglou marios-moschos	setter	180	75	2002	302	297
	Poimenidis christos	libero	180	74	2001	302	297
	Pomonis apostolos	opposite	190	75	2001	310	288
	Retzios fotios	setter	185	81	2001	303	298
	Saltaferidis christos	outside-spiker	183	70	2000	311	306
	Sonakis anastasios	libero	182	68	2001	312	290
	Stratos apostolos	outside-spiker	187	66	2002	317	312
	Tzougkarakis alexandros	middle-blocker	191	79	2002	312	307
