= Bulgaria men's national under-19 volleyball team =

Youth volleyball team representing Bulgaria

Bulgaria Boys' U19
- Association: Bulgarian Volleyball Federation
- Confederation: CEV

Uniforms
Home	Away	Third

Youth Olympic Games
- Appearances: No Appearances

FIVB U19 World Championship
- Appearances: 9 (First in 1989)
- Best result: (silver) Runners up : (2021)

Europe U19 / U18 Championship
- Appearances: 11 (First in 2005)
- Best result: (bronze) Third place : (2022)
- Official website (in Bulgarian)
Honours
Medal record
U19 World Championship
Silver medal – second place	2021 Iran
Bronze medal – third place	1989 United Arab Emirates

The Bulgaria men's national under-19 volleyball team represents Bulgaria in international men's volleyball competitions and friendly matches under the age 19 and it is ruled by the Bulgarian Volleyball Federation body that is an affiliate of the Federation of International Volleyball FIVB and also part of the European Volleyball Confederation CEV.

== Results ==
=== Summer Youth Olympics ===
Champions Runners up Third place Fourth place

Youth Olympic Games
Year	Round	Position	Pld	W	L	SW	SL	Squad
(Singapore) 2010	Didn't qualify							
(China) 2014	No Volleyball Event							
(Argentina) 2018	No Volleyball Event							
Total	0 Titles	0/1						

=== FIVB U19 World Championship ===
Champions Runners up Third place Fourth place

FIVB U19 World Championship
Year	Round	Position	Pld	W	L	SW	SL	Squad
(United Arab Emirates) 1989	Semifinals	Third place	6	5	1	18	6	
(Portugal) 1991	7th–8th places	8th place						
(Turkey) 1993	Didn't qualify							
(Puerto Rico) 1995	Didn't qualify							
(Iran) 1997	Didn't qualify							
(Saudi Arabia) 1999	Didn't qualify							
(Egypt) 2001	Didn't qualify							
(Thailand) 2003	Didn't qualify							
(Algeria) 2005	Preliminary Round	9th place	4	1	3	5	9	
(Mexico) 2007	Didn't qualify							
(Italy) 2009	Didn't qualify							
(Argentina) 2011	Second round	6th place	8	4	4	16	15	
(Mexico) 2013	Didn't qualify							
(Argentina) 2015	Round of 16	12th place	8	3	5	16	17	Squad
(Bahrain) 2017	Didn't qualify							
(Tunisia) 2019	Quarterfinals	7th place	8	3	5	14	19	Squad
(Iran) 2021	Final	Runners up	8	6	2	19	10	
(Argentina) 2023	Quarterfinals	5th Place	8	6	2	19	14	
(Uzbekistan) 2025	Quarterfinals	6th Place	9	6	3	21	13	
Total	0 Titles	9/19						

=== Europe U19 / U18 Championship ===
Champions Runners up Third place Fourth place

Europe U19 / U18 Championship
Year	Round	Position	Pld	W	L	SW	SL	Squad
(Spain) 1995	Didn't qualify							
(Slovakia) 1997	Didn't qualify							
(Poland) 1999	Didn't qualify							
(Czech Republic) 2001	Didn't qualify							
(Croatia) 2003	Didn't qualify							
(Latvia) 2005		6th place						
(Austria) 2007	Didn't qualify							
(Netherlands) 2009		8th place						
(Turkey) 2011		4th place						
(Bosnia and Herzegovina) / (Serbia) 2013		10th place						
(Turkey) 2015		6th place						
(Hungary) / (Slovakia) 2017		12th place						
(Czech Republic) / (Slovakia) 2018		6th place						
(Italy) 2020		4th place						
(Georgia (country)) 2022		Third place						
(Bulgaria) 2024		10th place						
(Italy) 2026		Third place						
Total	0 Titles	11/17						

== Team ==
=== Current squad ===
The following players are the Bulgarian players that have competed in the 2018 Boys' U18 Volleyball European Championship

#	name	position	height	weight	birthday	spike	block
	velev ivan	outside-spiker	193	82	2001	325	305
	valchinov samuil	outside-spiker	194	77	2001	324	310
	karyagin denis	outside-spiker	202	84	2002	325	310
	zahariev nikolay	opposite	203	75	2001	335	320
	albaadzh albert	opposite	193	80	2001	342	321
	apostolov zhelyazko	setter	198	82	2001	344	321
	telkiyski lyuboslav	setter	197	73	2001	320	311
	hristov andrey	middle-blocker	201	75	2001	325	310
	petrov petar	outside-spiker	191	67	2001	330	310
	ivanov petko	outside-spiker	190	85	2001	327	308
	dimitrov miroslav	middle-blocker	203	83	2001	341	321
	yordanov teodor	middle-blocker	197	69	2002	325	310
	georgiev bozhidar	setter	192	80	2001	320	305
	dimitrov todor	outside-spiker	193	69	2001	324	302
	alipiev bozhidar	outside-spiker	190	86	2001	326	311
	basin yordan	opposite	192	81	2001	320	305
	dimitrov martin	setter	190	71	2001	318	295
	dobrev simeon	libero	165	58	2001	280	270
	hakkaev hakan	outside-spiker	191	76	2002	310	300
	kirilov georgi	libero	177	59	2001	285	270
	kolev damyan	libero	178	68	2002	295	280
	manolov borislav	middle-blocker	198	75	2001	325	310
	ognyanov damyan	opposite	197	79	2001	320	310
	trendafilov yordan	outside-spiker	195	79	2001	320	305
	tsvetanov radoslav	outside-spiker	193	77	2001	325	310

== See also ==
- Bulgaria men's team
- Bulgaria men's U19 team
- Bulgaria men's U21 team
- Bulgaria men's U23 team
- Bulgaria women's team
