= Austria men's national under-19 volleyball team =

Youth volleyball team representing Austria

Austria Boys' U19
- Association: Austrian Volleyball Federation
- Confederation: CEV

Uniforms
| Home | Away | Third |

FIVB U19 World Championship
- Appearances: No Appearances

Europe U19 / U18 Championship
- Appearances: 4 (First in 2007)
- Best result: 8th place : (2013)
- Volleyball Association of Austria (in German)

The Austria men's national under-19 volleyball team represents Austria in international men's volleyball competitions and friendly matches under the age 19 and it is ruled by the Austrian Volleyball Federation body that is an affiliate of the Federation of International Volleyball FIVB and also part of the European Volleyball Confederation CEV.

== Results ==
=== Summer Youth Olympics ===
Champions Runners up Third place Fourth place

Youth Olympic Games
| Year | Round | Position | Pld | W | L | SW | SL | Squad |
|---|---|---|---|---|---|---|---|---|
| (Singapore) 2010 | Didn't qualify | | | | | | | |
| (China) 2014 | No Volleyball Event | | | | | | | |
| (Argentina) 2018 | No Volleyball Event | | | | | | | |
| Total | 0 Titles | 0/1 | | | | | | |

=== FIVB U19 World Championship ===
Champions Runners up Third place Fourth place

FIVB U19 World Championship
| Year | Round | Position | Pld | W | L | SW | SL | Squad |
|---|---|---|---|---|---|---|---|---|
| (United Arab Emirates) 1989 To (Uzbekistan) 2025 | Didn't qualify | | | | | | | |
| Total | 0 Titles | 0/19 | | | | | | |

=== Europe U19 / U18 Championship ===
Champions Runners up Third place Fourth place

Europe U19 / U18 Championship
| Year | Round | Position | Pld | W | L | SW | SL | Squad |
|---|---|---|---|---|---|---|---|---|
| (Spain) → 1995 | Didn't qualify | | | | | | | |
| (Latvia) ← 2005 | Didn't qualify | | | | | | | |
| (Austria) 2007 | | 10th place | | | | | | |
| (Netherlands) 2009 | | 10th place | | | | | | |
| (Turkey) 2011 | Didn't qualify | | | | | | | |
| (Bosnia and Herzegovina) / (Serbia) 2013 | | 8th place | | | | | | |
| (Turkey) → 2015 | Didn't qualify | | | | | | | |
| (Italy) ← 2022 | Didn't qualify | | | | | | | |
| (Bulgaria) 2024 | | 14th place | | | | | | |
| (Italy) 2026 | Didn't qualify | | | | | | | |
| Total | 0 Titles | 4/17 | | | | | | |

== Team ==
=== Current squad ===
The following players are the Austrian players that have competed in the 2018 Boys' U18 Volleyball European Championship

| # | name | position | height | weight | birthday | spike | block |
| | alagic adonis | setter | 179 | 76 | 2001 | 312 | 290 |
| | antoni niels | setter | 183 | 60 | 2002 | 303 | 280 |
| | bancsich fabian | middle-blocker | 195 | 87 | 2001 | 320 | 310 |
| | fuchshuber daniel | outside-spiker | 185 | 75 | 2001 | 300 | 290 |
| | glatz matthias | libero | 174 | 65 | 2002 | 306 | 286 |
| | grössig laurenc | opposite | 190 | 83 | 2001 | 321 | 303 |
| | hiedl julian | outside-spiker | 190 | 68 | 2002 | 308 | 299 |
| | hirsch florian | opposite | 191 | 84 | 2002 | 329 | 310 |
| | holzner peter raul georg | middle-blocker | 199 | 93 | 2001 | 325 | 305 |
| | krassnig noel simon jakob | outside-spiker | 192 | 72 | 2002 | 315 | 294 |
| | langwieser hannes | libero | 173 | 56 | 2002 | 290 | 270 |
| | maderböck paul | outside-spiker | 180 | 71 | 2002 | 300 | 290 |
| | ochaya liam | outside-spiker | 182 | 83 | 2001 | 332 | 308 |
| | reininger marvin sergio | setter | 170 | 75 | 2001 | 280 | 270 |
| | schedl maximilian | opposite | 202 | 90 | 2001 | 339 | 316 |
| | schlederer patrick | outside-spiker | 182 | 63 | 2001 | 315 | 296 |
| | stockhammer ben | outside-spiker | 185 | 72 | 2002 | 305 | 295 |
| | wultsch mathias | middle-blocker | 195 | 87 | 2001 | 313 | 298 |
| | zehetmayer christoph | middle-blocker | 192 | 87 | 2002 | 310 | 300 |
| | zwickle matthias | setter | 188 | 70 | 2001 | 313 | 294 |
