= 2026 Men's U18 European Volleyball Championship =

Tournament details
- Host country: Italy
- Cities: Cisterna di Latina; Porto San Giorgio
- Dates: 4–18 July 2026
- Teams: 16
- Venues: 2

Final positions
- Champions: Poland (3rd title)

The 2026 Men's U18 European Volleyball Championship, also referred to as EuroVolleyU18M 2026, will be the 17th edition of the biannual continental tournament for men's under-18 national volleyball teams, organised by Europe's governing volleyball body, CEV. The tournament will be held between from 4 to 18 July 2026. It will be organised in Italy, marking the second time the country will host this championship after 2020.

16 teams will participate for the second time since the expansion in 2024. Qualification took place between October 2025 and March 2026 to decide the final 15 spots. The hosts Italy qualified automatically.

This competition acts as a qualifier, with the top teams qualifying for the 2027 FIVB Volleyball Boys' U19 World Championship in an unknown country.

France are the defending champions, having beaten Italy, 3–0, in the final in Sofia.

== Group stage ==
=== Pool A ===
- All times are local.

Pos	Team	Pld	W	L	Pts	SW	SL	SR	SPW	SPL	SPR	Qualification
1	Poland	7	7	0	21	21	2	10.500	563	440	1.280	Semifinals
2	Italy (H)	7	6	1	17	19	8	2.375	617	544	1.134	Semifinals
3	Slovenia	7	5	2	15	16	9	1.778	600	541	1.109	
4	Greece	7	4	3	11	13	13	1.000	567	584	0.971	
5	Finland	7	3	4	7	12	17	0.706	644	666	0.967	
6	Serbia	7	2	5	9	12	16	0.750	598	609	0.982	
7	Turkey	7	1	6	4	10	18	0.556	591	625	0.946	
8	Iceland	7	0	7	0	1	21	0.048	377	548	0.688	

Updated to match(es) played on 12 July 2026. Source: Report
(H) Host

Date	Time		Score		Set 1	Set 2	Set 3	Set 4	Set 5	Total	Report
7 July	12:30	Poland	3–0	Iceland	25–15	25–20	25–22			75–57	Report
7 July	15:00	Finland	3–2	Turkey	16–25	22–25	25–22	25–21	18–16	106–109	Report
7 July	17:30	Greece	1–3	Slovenia	25–17	22–25	19–25	14–25		80–92	Report
7 July	20:00	Italy	3–2	Serbia	15–25	25–23	25–14	15–25	15–9	95–96	Report
8 July	12:30	Turkey	1–3	Greece	25–20	20–25	16–25	20–25		81–95	Report
8 July	15:00	Iceland	0–3	Serbia	20–25	13–25	20–25			53–75	Report
8 July	17:30	Slovenia	0–3	Poland	24–26	23–25	24–26			71–77	Report
8 July	20:00	Italy	3–1	Finland	25–18	25–23	17–25	25–22		92–88	Report
9 July	12:30	Iceland	0–3	Slovenia	24–26	14–25	18–25			56–76	Report
9 July	15:00	Poland	3–1	Turkey	25–18	17–25	25–17	25–15		92–75	Report
9 July	17:30	Finland	3–2	Serbia	25–23	25–19	17–25	23–25	15–13	105–105	Report
9 July	20:00	Greece	0–3	Italy	15–25	17–25	18–25			50–75	Report
11 July	12:30	Serbia	0–3	Slovenia	19–25	23–25	19–25			61–75	Report
11 July	15:00	Finland	1–3	Greece	25–21	24–26	30–32	25–27		104–106	Report
11 July	17:30	Turkey	3–0	Iceland	25–14	25–21	25–10			75–45	Report
11 July	20:00	Italy	1–3	Poland	25–19	20–25	19–25	23–25		87–94	Report
12 July	12:30	Greece	3–2	Serbia	25–17	31–33	25–21	21–25	16–14	118–110	Report
12 July	15:00	Finland	0–3	Poland	21–25	16–25	19–25			56–75	Report
12 July	17:30	Slovenia	3–1	Turkey	25–17	22–25	25–13	25–21		97–76	Report
12 July	20:00	Iceland	0–3	Italy	14–25	11–25	12–25			37–75	Report
14 July	12:30	Greece	0–3	Poland	21–25	11–25	11–25			43–75	Report
14 July	15:00	Serbia	3–1	Turkey	25–23	27–25	23–25	25–15		100–88	Report
14 July	17:30	Finland	3–1	Iceland	25–19	22–25	25–21	25–17		97–82	Report
14 July	20:00	Italy	3–1	Slovenia	28–30	25–19	25–23	25–20		103–92	Report
15 July	12:30	Finland	1–3	Slovenia	21–25	25–22	22–25	20–25		88–97	Report
15 July	15:00	Greece	3–0	Iceland	25–12	25–17	25–18			75–47	Report
15 July	17:30	Serbia	0–3	Poland	17–25	18–25	16–25			51–75	Report
15 July	20:00	Turkey	1–3	Italy	24–26	17–25	25–14	21–25		87–90	Report

=== Pool B ===
Pos	Team	Pld	W	L	Pts	SW	SL	SR	SPW	SPL	SPR	Qualification
1	France	7	6	1	18	19	6	3.167	610	523	1.166	Semifinals
2	Bulgaria	7	5	2	16	18	8	2.250	614	563	1.091	Semifinals
3	Spain	7	5	2	13	16	12	1.333	629	611	1.029	
4	Germany	7	4	3	12	15	13	1.154	614	612	1.003	
5	Czech Republic	7	4	3	11	14	13	1.077	615	610	1.008	
6	Belgium	7	3	4	8	10	16	0.625	577	586	0.985	
7	Romania	7	1	6	6	11	19	0.579	632	671	0.942	
8	Netherlands	7	0	7	0	5	21	0.238	518	633	0.818	

Updated to match(es) played on 12 July 2026. Source: Report

Date	Time		Score		Set 1	Set 2	Set 3	Set 4	Set 5	Total	Report
7 July	12:30	Netherlands	1–3	Romania	23–25	25–21	15–25	22–25		85–96	Report
7 July	15:00	France	1–3	Bulgaria	23–25	25–18	21–25	19–25		88–93	Report
7 July	17:30	Germany	2–3	Belgium	30–28	14–25	25–21	15–25	8–15	92–114	Report
7 July	20:00	Spain	1–3	Czech Republic	21–25	21–25	27–25	20–25		89–100	Report
8 July	12:30	Bulgaria	1–3	Germany	25–20	23–25	23–25	17–25		88–95	Report
8 July	15:00	Romania	2–3	Czech Republic	25–19	22–25	25–21	20–25	13–15	105–105	Report
8 July	17:30	Belgium	3–1	Netherlands	25–15	25–21	23–25	25–21		98–82	Report
8 July	20:00	Spain	0–3	France	17–25	21–25	20–25			58–75	Report
9 July	12:30	Romania	1–3	Belgium	22–25	25–13	20–25	25–27		92–90	Report
9 July	15:00	Netherlands	1–3	Bulgaria	20–25	15–25	26–24	23–25		84–99	Report
9 July	17:30	France	3–1	Czech Republic	25–17	18–25	25–16	29–27		97–85	Report
9 July	20:00	Germany	1–3	Spain	21–25	26–24	23–25	17–25		87–99	Report
11 July	12:30	Czech Republic	3–0	Belgium	25–23	25–17	25–17			75–57	Report
11 July	15:00	France	3–0	Germany	25–20	25–17	25–22			75–59	Report
11 July	17:30	Bulgaria	3–0	Romania	25–19	25–18	25–18			75–55	Report
11 July	20:00	Spain	3–0	Netherlands	25–16	25–17	25–21			75–54	Report
12 July	12:30	Germany	3–1	Czech Republic	26–24	25–22	23–25	25–16		99–87	Report
12 July	15:00	France	3–1	Netherlands	25–19	25–17	18–25	25–16		93–77	Report
12 July	17:30	Belgium	0–3	Bulgaria	22–25	23–25	19–25			64–75	Report
12 July	20:00	Romania	2–3	Spain	23–25	19–25	25–23	25–18	7–15	99–106	Report
14 July	12:30	Germany	3–0	Netherlands	25–19	25–14	25–15			75–48	Report
14 July	15:00	Czech Republic	0–3	Bulgaria	22–25	22–25	22–25			66–75	Report
14 July	17:30	France	3–1	Romania	28–30	25–16	25–20	25–18		103–84	Report
14 July	20:00	Spain	3–1	Belgium	16–25	25–21	25–19	25–22		91–87	Report
15 July	12:30	France	3–0	Belgium	25–21	25–19	29–27			79–67	Report
15 July	15:00	Germany	3–2	Romania	25–22	20–25	25–19	22–25	15–10	107–101	Report
15 July	17:30	Czech Republic	3–1	Netherlands	25–21	22–25	25–22	25–20		97–88	Report
15 July	20:00	Bulgaria	2–3	Spain	28–30	25–18	19–25	25–23	12–15	109–111	Report

== Final four ==
Semifinals
17 July
Poland	3
Bulgaria	2
17 July
France	3
Italy	2

Final
18 July
Poland	3
France	1
3rd place match
18 July
Bulgaria	3
Italy	0

=== Semifinals ===
Date	Time		Score		Set 1	Set 2	Set 3	Set 4	Set 5	Total	Report
17 Jul	17:00	Poland	3–2	Bulgaria	19–25	25–19	33–35	25–17	15–10	117–106	Report
17 Jul	19:30	France	3–2	Italy	20–25	25–14	25–21	23–25	15–12	108–97	Report

=== 3rd place match ===
Date	Time		Score		Set 1	Set 2	Set 3	Set 4	Set 5	Total	Report
18 Jul	17:00	Bulgaria	3–0	Italy	25–19	25–19	25–23			75–61	Report

=== Final ===
Date	Time		Score		Set 1	Set 2	Set 3	Set 4	Set 5	Total	Report
18 Jul	19:30	Poland	3–1	France	22–25	25–23	28–26	25–21		100–95	Report

== Final standing ==
Rank	Team
1st place, gold medalist(s)	Poland
2nd place, silver medalist(s)	France
3rd place, bronze medalist(s)	Bulgaria
4	Italy
5	Slovenia
6	Spain
7	Germany
8	Greece
9	Czech Republic
10	Finland
11	Belgium
12	Serbia
13	Romania
14	Turkey
15	Netherlands
16	Iceland

Qualified for the 2027 U19 World Championship as defending champions
Qualified for the 2027 U19 World Championship

== Qualified teams for FIVB U19 World Championship ==
The following teams from CEV qualified for the 2027 FIVB Boys' U19 World Championship.

Team	Qualified on	Previous appearances in the FIVB U19 World Championship^{1}
Poland	12 July 2026	13 (1993, 1997, 1999, 2001, 2003, 2005, 2007, 2009, 2013, **2015**, 2017, **2021**, 2025)
Slovenia	14 July 2026	1 (2023)
Italy	14 July 2026	12 (1995, **1997**, 2001, 2003, 2005, 2009, 2015, 2017, **2019**, 2021, 2023, 2025)
Bulgaria	14 July 2026	9 (1989, 1991, 2005, 2011, 2015, 2019, 2021, 2023, 2025)
Germany	15 July 2026	4 (2007, 2015, 2019, 2021)
Spain	15 July 2026	4 (1995, 2009, 2011, 2025)

^{1} Bold indicates champions for that year.

== See also ==
- 2026 AVC Boys' U18 Volleyball Championship
- 2026 Men's U22 European Volleyball Championship
- 2026 Men's European Volleyball Championship
- 2026 Men's European Volleyball League
