= 2024 Men's U18 European Volleyball Championship =

16th edition of the Men's U18 European Volleyball Championship

2024 Men's U18 Volleyball European Championship

Tournament details
- Host country: Bulgaria
- Cities: Plovdiv; Sofia
- Dates: 10–21 July
- Teams: 16 (from 1 confederation)
- Venue: 2 (in 2 host cities)

Final positions
- Champions: France (3rd title)
- Runners-up: Italy
- Third place: Poland

The 2024 Men's U18 Volleyball European Championship is the 16th edition of the CEV U18 Volleyball European Championship, organised by Europe's governing volleyball body, the CEV. The tournament is currently held in Plovdiv and Sofia, Bulgaria, from 10 to 21 July 2024. The top teams of the tournament will qualify for the 2025 FIVB Volleyball Boys' U19 World Championship as the CEV representatives.

Players must be born on or after 1 January 2007.

== Host selection ==
Bulgaria were given the hosting rights on 12 October 2022.

== Qualification ==
Means of qualification		Qualifier
Host country		Bulgaria
Qualification 1st round	BVA	Romania
Qualification 1st round	EEVZA	Poland
Qualification 1st round	MEVZA	Slovenia
Qualification 1st round	NEVZA	Finland
Qualification 1st round	WEVZA	France
Qualification 2nd round	Pool A	Italy; Greece
Qualification 2nd round	Pool B	Turkey; Austria
Qualification 2nd round	Pool C	Spain; Ukraine
Qualification 2nd round	Pool D	Portugal; Belgium
Qualification 2nd round	Pool E	Czech Republic; Estonia

== Draw ==
The draw was held on 18 April 2024 in Luxembourg.

== Venues ==
The venues are in Sofia and Plovdiv.

Pool I, Final round		Pool II	
(Bulgaria) Sofia	Sofia is located in Bulgaria	Plovdiv	Plovdiv is located in Bulgaria
Levski Sofia Sports Hall	Sofia is located in Bulgaria	Kolodruma	Plovdiv is located in Bulgaria
Capacity: 1,800	Sofia is located in Bulgaria	Capacity: 6,100	Plovdiv is located in Bulgaria

== Group stage ==
=== Pool A ===
- All times are local.

Pos	Team	Pld	W	L	Pts	SW	SL	SR	SPW	SPL	SPR	Qualification
1	France	7	7	0	21	21	4	5.250	615	508	1.211	Semifinals
2	Poland	7	6	1	18	19	5	3.800	583	468	1.246	Semifinals
3	Finland	7	5	2	14	17	9	1.889	619	572	1.082	
4	Turkey	7	4	3	12	14	13	1.077	585	598	0.978	
5	Bulgaria (H)	7	3	4	9	11	13	0.846	532	539	0.987	
6	Portugal	7	2	5	6	9	15	0.600	506	569	0.889	
7	Austria	7	1	6	4	5	18	0.278	470	548	0.858	
8	Ukraine	7	0	7	0	2	21	0.095	457	565	0.809	

Source: Report
(H) Host

Date	Time		Score		Set 1	Set 2	Set 3	Set 4	Set 5	Total	Report
10 July	12:30	Austria	0–3	France	11–25	22–25	21–25			54–75	Report
10 July	15:00	Finland	3–2	Turkey	25–23	22–25	25–14	24–26	15–12	111–100	Report
10 July	17:30	Bulgaria	3–1	Portugal	23–25	25–15	25–20	25–18		98–78	Report
10 July	20:00	Ukraine	0–3	Poland	12–25	14–25	12–25			38–75	Report
11 July	12:30	Portugal	1–3	Turkey	23–25	22–25	25–17	16–25		86–92	Report
11 July	15:00	France	3–1	Finland	23–25	28–26	25–23	25–19		101–93	Report
11 July	17:30	Bulgaria	3–0	Ukraine	26–24	25–20	25–21			76–65	Report
11 July	20:00	Poland	3–0	Austria	25–23	25–14	25–13			75–50	Report
12 July	12:30	Ukraine	0–3	Portugal	21–25	20–25	23–25			64–75	Report
12 July	15:00	Finland	1–3	Poland	23–25	16–25	27–25	26–28		92–103	Report
12 July	17:30	Austria	0–3	Bulgaria	17–25	14–25	23–25			54–75	Report
12 July	20:00	Turkey	0–3	France	21–25	18–25	18–25			57–75	Report
14 July	12:30	Ukraine	0–3	Austria	17–25	23–25	24–26			64–76	Report
14 July	15:00	Poland	3–0	Turkey	25–13	25–23	27–25			77–61	Report
14 July	17:30	Bulgaria	1–3	Finland	16–25	25–22	19–25	23–25		83–97	Report
14 July	20:00	Portugal	1–3	France	22–25	20–25	25–21	18–25		85–96	Report
15 July	12:30	Finland	3–0	Ukraine	25–18	25–20	25–22			75–60	Report
15 July	15:00	Austria	0–3	Portugal	24–26	22–25	23–25			69–76	Report
15 July	17:30	Turkey	3–0	Bulgaria	25–18	25–23	25–22			75–63	Report
15 July	20:00	France	3–1	Poland	26–24	22–25	25–17	25–17		98–83	Report
17 July	12:30	Portugal	0–3	Poland	19–25	13–25	17–25			49–75	Report
17 July	15:00	Ukraine	1–3	Turkey	23–25	25–18	20–25	19–25		87–93	Report
17 July	17:30	Bulgaria	0–3	France	22–25	13–25	22–25			57–75	Report
17 July	20:00	Austria	0–3	Finland	24–26	23–25	21–25			68–76	Report
18 July	12:30	France	3–1	Ukraine	25–22	20–25	25–9	25–23		95–79	Report
18 July	15:00	Turkey	3–2	Austria	21–25	25–22	25–17	21–25	15–10	107–99	Report
18 July	17:30	Finland	3–0	Portugal	25–17	25–23	25–17			75–57	Report
18 July	20:00	Poland	3–1	Bulgaria	20–25	25–18	25–20	25–17		95–80	Report

=== Pool B ===
Pos	Team	Pld	W	L	Pts	SW	SL	SR	SPW	SPL	SPR	Qualification
1	Italy	7	7	0	21	21	2	10.500	579	422	1.372	Semifinals
2	Spain	7	5	2	15	16	8	2.000	594	533	1.114	Semifinals
3	Belgium	7	5	2	14	16	12	1.333	650	617	1.053	
4	Slovenia	7	4	3	11	14	12	1.167	600	596	1.007	
5	Czech Republic	7	3	4	10	12	13	0.923	546	569	0.960	
6	Greece	7	3	4	8	11	15	0.733	571	597	0.956	
7	Estonia	7	1	6	4	7	19	0.368	538	636	0.846	
8	Romania	7	0	7	1	5	21	0.238	525	633	0.829	

Source: Report

Date	Time		Score		Set 1	Set 2	Set 3	Set 4	Set 5	Total	Report
10 July	12:30	Romania	1–3	Belgium	25–23	18–25	13–25	17–25		73–98	Report
10 July	15:00	Greece	3–1	Slovenia	25–22	25–23	23–25	25–21		98–91	Report
10 July	17:30	Italy	3–0	Estonia	25–18	25–17	25–17			75–52	Report
10 July	20:00	Spain	3–0	Czech Republic	25–15	25–18	29–27			79–60	Report
11 July	12:00	Estonia	1–3	Slovenia	25–17	25–27	16–25	14–25		80–94	Report
11 July	15:00	Belgium	3–1	Greece	18–25	25–22	25–23	25–23		93–93	Report
11 July	17:30	Italy	3–0	Spain	25–22	25–14	34–32			84–68	Report
11 July	20:00	Czech Republic	3–0	Romania	25–20	25–22	25–19			75–61	Report
12 July	12:00	Spain	3–1	Estonia	21–25	25–19	25–11	25–15		96–70	Report
12 July	15:00	Greece	1–3	Czech Republic	25–23	20–25	21–25	20–25		86–98	Report
12 July	17:30	Romania	1–3	Italy	9–25	19–25	25–22	18–25		71–97	Report
12 July	20:00	Slovenia	3–0	Belgium	26–24	29–27	25–17			80–68	Report
14 July	12:00	Spain	3–0	Romania	25–19	25–22	25–19			75–60	Report
14 July	15:00	Czech Republic	2–3	Slovenia	25–23	21–25	25–21	23–25	9–15	103–109	Report
14 July	17:30	Italy	3–0	Greece	25–20	25–18	25–17			75–55	Report
14 July	20:00	Estonia	2–3	Belgium	28–26	19–25	19–25	30–28	11–15	107–119	Report
15 July	12:00	Greece	0–3	Spain	16–25	19–25	22–25			57–75	Report
15 July	15:00	Romania	1–3	Estonia	23–25	23–25	31–29	25–27		102–106	Report
15 July	17:30	Slovenia	0–3	Italy	21–25	10–25	15–25			46–75	Report
15 July	20:00	Belgium	3–1	Czech Republic	25–18	23–25	25–21	25–21		98–85	Report
17 July	12:00	Estonia	0–3	Czech Republic	17–25	22–25	22–25			61–75	Report
17 July	15:00	Spain	3–1	Slovenia	31–33	28–26	25–15	33–31		117–105	Report
17 July	17:30	Italy	3–1	Belgium	23–25	25–19	25–19	25–14		98–77	Report
17 July	20:00	Romania	2–3	Greece	21–25	25–16	25–23	16–25	16–18	103–107	Report
18 July	12:00	Belgium	3–1	Spain	25–23	25–14	22–25	25–22		97–84	Report
18 July	15:00	Slovenia	3–0	Romania	25–15	25–21	25–19			75–55	Report
18 July	17:30	Greece	3–0	Estonia	25–20	25–21	25–21			75–62	Report
18 July	20:00	Czech Republic	0–3	Italy	10–25	21–25	22–25			53–75	Report

== Final four ==
Semifinals
20 July
France	3
Spain	0
20 July
Poland	1
Italy	3

Final
21 July
France	3
Italy	0
3rd place match
21 July
Spain	2
Poland	3

=== Semifinals ===
Date	Time		Score		Set 1	Set 2	Set 3	Set 4	Set 5	Total	Report
20 Jul	14:30	France	3–0	Spain	25–20	25–19	25–20			75–59	Report
20 Jul	17:30	Poland	1–3	Italy	23–25	25–21	18–25	23–25		89–96	Report

=== 3rd place match ===
Date	Time		Score		Set 1	Set 2	Set 3	Set 4	Set 5	Total	Report
21 Jul	15:30	Spain	2–3	Poland	21–25	20–25	30–28	28–26	12–15	111–119	Report

=== Final ===
Date	Time		Score		Set 1	Set 2	Set 3	Set 4	Set 5	Total	Report
21 Jul	18:30	France	3–0	Italy	25–15	25–20	25–21			75–56	Report

== Final standing ==
Rank	Team
1st place, gold medalist(s)	France
2nd place, silver medalist(s)	Italy
3rd place, bronze medalist(s)	Poland
4	Spain
5	Finland
6	Belgium
7	Turkey
8	Slovenia
9	Czech Republic
10	Bulgaria
11	Greece
12	Portugal
13	Estonia
14	Austria
15	Romania
16	Ukraine

Qualified for the 2025 U19 World Championship
Qualified for the 2025 U19 World Championship as defending champions

2024 Boys' U18 European champions

France
3rd title

14–man roster
Noa Duflos-Rossi, Pierre Delaporte, Timéo Mistoco, Théo Martzluff, Ino Dukic, Ewen Renevot, Thomas Schmitz-Straumann, Guillaume Respaut, Andrej Jokanovic, Daniel Iyegbekedo, Viden Natzev, William Laplace, Sadjhy Crane, Mathys Lapierre
Head coach
Jean-Manuel Leprovost
