= CEV U18 Volleyball European Championship =

International boys' junior volleyball event

- Most recent season or competition: 2026 Men's U18 European Volleyball Championship
- Sport: Volleyball
- Founded: 1995; 31 years ago
- First season: 1995
- No. of teams: 16 (2026)
- Continent: Europe (CEV)
- Most recent champion: Poland (3rd title)
- Most titles: Russia (5 titles)
- Website: cev.eu

The Boys' Youth European Volleyball Championship is a volleyball competition for men's national teams with players under the age of 18 years, currently held biannually and organized by the European Volleyball Confederation, the volleyball federation for Europe. Originally the age limit was 19; as of the 2018 edition, the competition age limit was changed from 19 to 18 and the name to U18 European Championship.

== Results summary ==
Year	Host	Final			3rd place match			Teams
Year	Host	Champions	Score	Runners-up	3rd place	Score	4th place	Teams
1995; Details	Spain	Russia	3–1	Italy	Poland	3–0	France	8
1997; Details	Slovakia	Italy	3–2	Greece	Poland	3–0	Czech Republic	8
1999; Details	Poland	Russia	3–0	Germany	Czech Republic	3–2	Poland	8
2001; Details	Czech Republic	Russia	3–1	Poland	France	3–1	Italy	8
2003; Details	Croatia	Russia	3–0	Poland	Italy	3–0	Germany	8
2005; Details	Latvia	Poland	3–2	France	Italy	3–0	Slovakia	12
2007; Details	Austria	France	3–2	Poland	Belgium	3–2	Russia	12
2009; Details	Netherlands	France	3–0	Serbia	Russia	3–2	Poland	12
2011; Details	Turkey	Serbia	3–2	France	Russia	3–1	Bulgaria	12
2013; Details	Bosnia and Herzegovina / Serbia	Russia	3–1	Poland	Belgium	3–2	Finland	12
2015; Details	Turkey	Poland	3–1	Italy	Turkey	3–1	Germany	12
2017; Details	Hungary / Slovakia	Czech Republic	3–2	Italy	Turkey	3–2	Russia	12
2018; Details	Czech Republic / Slovakia	Germany	3–0	Czech Republic	Italy	3–1	Russia	12
2020; Details	Italy	Italy	3–0	Czech Republic	Poland	3–1	Bulgaria	8
2022; Details	(Georgia (country)); Georgia	Italy	3–0	France	Bulgaria	3–2	Serbia	12
2024; Details	Bulgaria	France	3–0	Italy	Poland	3–2	Spain	16
2026; Details	Italy	Poland	3–1	France	Bulgaria	3–0	Italy	16

== Medal summary ==
Rank	Nation	Gold	Silver	Bronze	Total
1	Russia	5	0	2	7
2	Poland	3	4	4	11
3	Italy	3	4	3	10
4	France	3	4	1	8
5	Czech Republic	1	2	1	4
6	Germany	1	1	0	2
6	Serbia	1	1	0	2
8	Greece	0	1	0	1
9	Belgium	0	0	2	2
9	Bulgaria	0	0	2	2
9	Turkey	0	0	2	2
Totals (11 entries)		17	17	17	51

== Participating nations ==
Nation	(Spain) 1995	(Slovakia) 1997	(Poland) 1999	(Czech Republic) 2001	(Croatia) 2003	(Latvia) 2005	(Austria) 2007	(Netherlands) 2009	(Turkey) 2011	(Bosnia and Herzegovina) (Serbia) 2013	(Turkey) 2015	(Hungary) (Slovakia) 2017	(Czech Republic) (Slovakia) 2018	(Italy) 2020	(Georgia (country)) 2022	(Bulgaria) 2024	(Italy) 2026	Years
Austria							10th	10th		8th						14th		4
Belarus								12th					5th	8th				3
Belgium							3rd	7th	7th	3rd		7th	7th	6th	6th	6th	Q	10
Bosnia and Herzegovina										12th								1
Bulgaria						6th		8th	4th	10th	6th	12th	6th	4th	3rd	10th	Q	11
Czech Republic		4th	3rd	6th	6th						7th	1st	2nd	2nd	7th	9th	Q	11
Croatia	7th				8th													2
Denmark											11th							1
Estonia						11th	12th									13th		3
Finland		8th							12th	4th		8th			10th	5th	Q	7
France	4th	5th	7th	3rd		2nd	1st	1st	2nd	6th	9th	6th	8th		2nd	1st	Q	15
Georgia															12th			1
Germany			2nd	5th	4th	10th	5th		11th		4th		1st	5th	11th		Q	11
Greece		2nd							6th				11th		9th	11th	Q	6
Hungary								11th				10th						2
Iceland																	Q	1
Italy	2nd	1st	8th	4th	3rd	3rd	8th	9th		7th	2nd	2nd	3rd	1st	1st	2nd	Q	16
Latvia						9th	11th											2
Netherlands					5th		6th	6th									Q	4
Poland	3rd	3rd	4th	2nd	2nd	1st	2nd	4th	9th	2nd	1st	5th		3rd	8th	3rd	Q	16
Portugal	8th															12th		2
Romania											12th	9th				15th	Q	4
Russia	1st	7th	1st	1st	1st	5th	4th	3rd	3rd	1st	5th	4th	4th					13
Serbia						8th	7th	2nd	1st	11th	8th				4th		Q	8
Slovakia		6th	6th	7th	7th	4th						11th	12th					7
Slovenia				8th		7th				9th					5th	8th	Q	6
Spain	6th					12th		5th	5th		10th					4th	Q	7
Turkey							9th		8th	5th	3rd	3rd	9th	7th		7th	Q	9
Ukraine	5th		5th						10th				10th			16th		5

== Sources ==
- Home page
- CEV Boys Youth Volleyball European Championship – Competition History
