= 2018 Boys' U18 Volleyball European Championship =

Tournament details
- Host country: Czech Republic; Slovakia
- Dates: 7–15 April
- Teams: 12
- Venues: 2 (in 2 host cities)

Final positions
- Champions: Germany (1st title)

Tournament awards
- MVP: (Germany) Filip John

The 2018 Boys' Youth European Volleyball Championship was played in Czech Republic and Slovakia from 7 to 15 April 2018. The top six teams qualified for the 2019 U19 World Championship.

== Participating teams ==
- Hosts
  - Czech Republic
  - Slovakia
- Qualified through 2018 Boys' U18 Volleyball European Championship Qualification
  - Belarus
  - Belgium
  - Bulgaria
  - France
  - Germany
  - Greece
  - Italy
  - Russia
  - Turkey
  - Ukraine

== Pools composition ==
Pool A	Pool B
Czech Republic	Slovakia
Turkey	Russia
Bulgaria	Italy
Greece	Belgium
Belarus	France
Germany	Ukraine

== Preliminary round ==
=== Pool I ===
- Venue: Zlín, Czech Republic

Pos	Team	Pld	W	L	Pts	SW	SL	SR	SPW	SPL	SPR	Qualification
1	Germany	5	4	1	10	13	8	1.625	476	447	1.065	Semifinals
2	Czech Republic	5	3	2	9	12	9	1.333	467	448	1.042	Semifinals
3	Bulgaria	5	3	2	7	9	10	0.900	412	430	0.958	5th–8th Semifinals
4	Belarus	5	2	3	7	10	10	1.000	449	426	1.054	5th–8th Semifinals
5	Turkey	5	2	3	7	9	11	0.818	455	460	0.989	
6	Greece	5	1	4	5	8	13	0.615	419	467	0.897	

Date	Time		Score		Set 1	Set 2	Set 3	Set 4	Set 5	Total	Report
7 Apr	15:00	Belarus	1–3	Turkey	18–25	23–25	25–19	22–25		88–94	Report
7 Apr	17:30	Czech Republic	3–0	Greece	25–21	25–17	25–19			75–57	Report
7 Apr	20:00	Bulgaria	0–3	Germany	17–25	28–30	18–25			63–80	Report
8 Apr	15:00	Greece	3–1	Turkey	19–25	25–22	26–24	25–17		95–88	Report
8 Apr	17:30	Czech Republic	2–3	Bulgaria	19–25	25–21	18–25	25–18	9–15	96–104	Report
8 Apr	20:00	Germany	3–1	Belarus	25–19	29–31	25–19	25–19		104–88	Report
9 Apr	15:00	Bulgaria	3–2	Greece	22–25	25–19	26–24	22–25	15–13	110–106	Report
9 Apr	17:30	Belarus	2–3	Czech Republic	25–22	21–25	20–25	25–16	16–18	107–106	Report
9 Apr	20:00	Turkey	2–3	Germany	17–25	22–25	25–17	25–19	16–18	105–104	Report
11 Apr	15:00	Bulgaria	0–3	Belarus	17–25	16–25	21–25			54–75	Report
11 Apr	17:30	Czech Republic	1–3	Turkey	23–25	22–25	25–20	22–25		92–95	Report
11 Apr	20:00	Greece	2–3	Germany	19–25	25–21	25–17	19–25	5–15	93–103	Report
12 Apr	15:00	Turkey	0–3	Bulgaria	22–25	22–25	29–31			73–81	Report
12 Apr	17:30	Belarus	3–1	Greece	16–25	25–17	25–14	25–12		91–68	Report
12 Apr	20:00	Germany	1–3	Czech Republic	16–25	22–25	25–23	22–25		85–98	Report

=== Pool II ===
- Venue: Púchov, Slovakia

Pos	Team	Pld	W	L	Pts	SW	SL	SR	SPW	SPL	SPR	Qualification
1	Italy	5	5	0	15	15	1	15.000	392	297	1.320	Semifinals
2	Russia	5	4	1	12	13	3	4.333	389	300	1.297	Semifinals
3	Belgium	5	3	2	9	9	7	1.286	358	329	1.088	5th–8th Semifinals
4	France	5	2	3	6	7	10	0.700	348	387	0.899	5th–8th Semifinals
5	Ukraine	5	1	4	2	4	14	0.286	346	428	0.808	
6	Slovakia	5	0	5	1	2	15	0.133	322	414	0.778	

Date	Time		Score		Set 1	Set 2	Set 3	Set 4	Set 5	Total	Report
7 Apr	15:00	Ukraine	0–3	Italy	17–25	22–25	15–25			54–75	Report
7 Apr	17:30	Slovakia	0–3	Russia	23–25	17–25	12–25			52–75	Report
7 Apr	20:00	Belgium	3–1	France	25–17	17–25	25–8	25–18		92–68	Report
8 Apr	15:00	Italy	3–1	Russia	25–20	17–25	25–21	25–23		92–89	Report
8 Apr	17:30	France	3–0	Slovakia	25–17	25–21	26–24			76–62	Report
8 Apr	20:00	Ukraine	0–3	Belgium	17–25	20–25	14–25			51–75	Report
9 Apr	15:00	Russia	3–0	France	25–19	25–15	25–20			75–54	Report
9 Apr	17:30	Slovakia	2–3	Ukraine	16–25	26–28	25–20	27–25	11–15	105–113	Report
9 Apr	20:00	Belgium	0–3	Italy	18–25	23–25	18–25			59–75	Report
11 Apr	15:00	Ukraine	0–3	Russia	18–25	14–25	13–25			45–75	Report
11 Apr	17:30	Belgium	3–0	Slovakia	25–21	25–18	25–21			75–60	Report
11 Apr	20:00	Italy	3–0	France	25–18	25–19	25–15			75–52	Report
12 Apr	15:00	Russia	3–0	Belgium	25–13	25–22	25–22			75–57	Report
12 Apr	17:30	France	3–1	Ukraine	23–25	25–23	25–15	25–20		98–83	Report
12 Apr	20:00	Slovakia	0–3	Italy	11–25	12–25	20–25			43–75	Report

== 5th–8th classification ==
Semifinals
14 April
Bulgaria	3
France	0
14 April
Belarus	3
Belgium	1

5th place match
15 April
Bulgaria	1
Belarus	3
7th place match
15 April
France	2
Belgium	3

=== 5th–8th Semifinals ===
Date	Time		Score		Set 1	Set 2	Set 3	Set 4	Set 5	Total	Report
14 April	12:30	Bulgaria	3–0	France	29–27	25–22	25–19			79–68	Report
14 April	15:00	Belarus	3–1	Belgium	25–20	22–25	25–22	26–24		98–91	Report

=== 7th place match ===
Date	Time		Score		Set 1	Set 2	Set 3	Set 4	Set 5	Total	Report
15 April	10:30	France	2–3	Belgium	25–22	25–23	12–25	18–25	13–15	93–110	Report

=== 5th place match ===
Date	Time		Score		Set 1	Set 2	Set 3	Set 4	Set 5	Total	Report
15 April	13:00	Bulgaria	1–3	Belarus	25–22	19–25	19–25	19–25		82–97	Report

== Final round ==
Semifinals
14 April
Germany	3
Russia	0
14 April
Italy	2
Czech Republic	3

Final
15 April
Germany	3
Czech Republic	0
3rd place match
15 April
Russia	1
Italy	3

=== Semifinals ===
Date	Time		Score		Set 1	Set 2	Set 3	Set 4	Set 5	Total	Report
14 April	17:30	Italy	2–3	Czech Republic	25–21	19–25	25–19	15–25	13–15	97–105	Report
14 April	20:00	Germany	3–0	Russia	25–23	25–13	25–18			75–54	Report

=== 3rd place match ===
Date	Time		Score		Set 1	Set 2	Set 3	Set 4	Set 5	Total	Report
15 April	15:30	Russia	1–3	Italy	22–25	25–23	23–25	17–25		87–98	Report

=== Final ===
Date	Time		Score		Set 1	Set 2	Set 3	Set 4	Set 5	Total	Report
15 April	18:00	Germany	3–0	Czech Republic	26–22	25–17	25–20			76–59	Report

== Final standing ==
Rank	Team
1st place, gold medalist(s)	Germany
2nd place, silver medalist(s)	Czech Republic
3rd place, bronze medalist(s)	Italy
4	Russia
5	Belarus
6	Bulgaria
7	Belgium
8	France
9	Turkey
10	Ukraine
11	Greece
12	Slovakia

Qualified for the 2019 Boys' U19 World Championship

2018 Boys' U18 European champions

Germany
1st title

12–man roster
Jason Lieb, Moritz Eckardt, Simon Pfretzschner, Jan Breburda, Maximilian Kersting, Filip John, Erik Röhrs, Simon Torwie, Julian Hoyer, Ben Stoverink, Tobias Hosch, Jan Kolakowski
Head coach
Matus Kalny

== Awards ==
At the conclusion of the tournament, the following players were selected as the tournament dream team.

- Most valuable player
  (Germany) Filip John
- Best setter
  (Italy) Leonardo Ferrato
- Best outside spikers
  (Czech Republic) Matouš Drahanovský
  (Italy) Tommaso Stefani
- Best middle blockers
  (Czech Republic) Radek Baláž
  (Germany) Maximilian Kersting
- Best opposite spiker
  (Germany) Filip John
- Best libero
  (Russia) Ilia Fedorov
