= 2005 Boys' Youth European Volleyball Championship =

Tournament details
- Host country: Latvia
- Dates: March 29 – April 3
- Teams: 12
- Venue: (in 1 host city)

Final positions
- Champions: Poland (1st title)

Tournament awards
- MVP: (Poland) Jakub Jarosz

The 2005 Boys' Youth European Volleyball Championship was the 6th edition of the Boys' Youth European Volleyball Championship, organised by Europe's governing volleyball body, the CEV. It was held in Riga, Latvia from March 29 to April 3, 2005.

Poland won their 1st title in the tournament by defeating France. Jakub Jarosz was elected the Most Valuable Player.

== Participating teams ==
- Host
  - Latvia
- Qualified through 2005 Boys' Youth European Volleyball Championship Qualification
  - Bulgaria
  - Estonia
  - France
  - Germany
  - Italy
  - Poland
  - Russia
  - Serbia and Montenegro
  - Slovakia
  - Slovenia
  - Spain

== Pool composition ==
| Pool A | Pool B | Pool C | Pool D |
|---|---|---|---|
| Germany | Bulgaria | France | Serbia and Montenegro |
| Poland | Estonia | Slovakia | Slovenia |
| Russia | Italy | Latvia | Spain |

== Pool standing procedure ==
1. Match points
2. Numbers of matches won
3. Sets ratio
4. Points ratio
5. Result of the last match between the tied teams

Match won 3–0 or 3–1: 3 match points for the winner, 0 match points for the loser
Match won 3–2: 2 match points for the winner, 1 match point for the loser

== Preliminary round ==
- All times are Eastern European Time (UTC+03:00)

=== Pool A ===
| Pos | Team | Pld | W | L | Pts | SW | SL | SR | SPW | SPL | SPR | Qualification |
|---|---|---|---|---|---|---|---|---|---|---|---|---|
| 1 | Poland | 2 | 2 | 0 | 5 | 6 | 3 | 2.000 | 212 | 198 | 1.071 | Quarterfinals |
| 2 | Russia | 2 | 1 | 1 | 2 | 4 | 5 | 0.800 | 204 | 199 | 1.025 | Quarterfinals |
| 3 | Germany | 2 | 0 | 2 | 2 | 4 | 6 | 0.667 | 201 | 220 | 0.914 | 9th to 12th place |

| Date | Time | | Score | | Set 1 | Set 2 | Set 3 | Set 4 | Set 5 | Total | Report |
|---|---|---|---|---|---|---|---|---|---|---|---|
| 29 Mar | 12:00 | Germany | 2–3 | Poland | 28–26 | 21–25 | 25–20 | 16–25 | 13–15 | 103–111 | Report |
| 30 Mar | 12:00 | Russia | 3–2 | Germany | 27–25 | 22–25 | 20–25 | 25–14 | 15–9 | 109–98 | Report |
| 31 Mar | 12:00 | Poland | 3–1 | Russia | 23–25 | 25–21 | 25–23 | 28–26 | | 101–95 | Report |

=== Pool B ===
| Pos | Team | Pld | W | L | Pts | SW | SL | SR | SPW | SPL | SPR | Qualification |
|---|---|---|---|---|---|---|---|---|---|---|---|---|
| 1 | Italy | 2 | 2 | 0 | 6 | 6 | 1 | 6.000 | 170 | 124 | 1.371 | Quarterfinals |
| 2 | Bulgaria | 2 | 1 | 1 | 2 | 4 | 5 | 0.800 | 189 | 204 | 0.926 | Quarterfinals |
| 3 | Estonia | 2 | 0 | 2 | 1 | 2 | 6 | 0.333 | 153 | 184 | 0.832 | 9th to 12th place |

| Date | Time | | Score | | Set 1 | Set 2 | Set 3 | Set 4 | Set 5 | Total | Report |
|---|---|---|---|---|---|---|---|---|---|---|---|
| 29 Mar | 14:30 | Estonia | 2–3 | Bulgaria | 25–18 | 21–25 | 25–22 | 27–29 | 11–15 | 109–109 | Report |
| 30 Mar | 14:30 | Italy | 3–0 | Estonia | 25–11 | 25–17 | 25–16 | | | 75–44 | Report |
| 31 Mar | 14:30 | Bulgaria | 1–3 | Italy | 25–20 | 23–25 | 18–25 | 14–25 | | 80–95 | Report |

=== Pool C ===
| Pos | Team | Pld | W | L | Pts | SW | SL | SR | SPW | SPL | SPR | Qualification |
|---|---|---|---|---|---|---|---|---|---|---|---|---|
| 1 | France | 2 | 2 | 0 | 6 | 6 | 1 | 6.000 | 179 | 138 | 1.297 | Quarterfinals |
| 2 | Slovakia | 2 | 1 | 1 | 2 | 3 | 5 | 0.600 | 183 | 180 | 1.017 | Quarterfinals |
| 3 | Latvia | 2 | 0 | 2 | 1 | 3 | 6 | 0.500 | 171 | 215 | 0.795 | 9th to 12th place |

| Date | Time | | Score | | Set 1 | Set 2 | Set 3 | Set 4 | Set 5 | Total | Report |
|---|---|---|---|---|---|---|---|---|---|---|---|
| 29 Mar | 17:00 | Slovakia | 0–3 | France | 22–25 | 27–29 | 19–25 | | | 68–79 | Report |
| 30 Mar | 17:00 | Latvia | 2–3 | Slovakia | 17–25 | 29–27 | 17–25 | 25–23 | 13–15 | 101–115 | Report |
| 31 Mar | 17:00 | France | 3–1 | Latvia | 25–12 | 25–20 | 25–27 | 25–11 | | 100–70 | Report |

=== Pool D ===
| Pos | Team | Pld | W | L | Pts | SW | SL | SR | SPW | SPL | SPR | Qualification |
|---|---|---|---|---|---|---|---|---|---|---|---|---|
| 1 | Serbia and Montenegro | 2 | 2 | 0 | 6 | 6 | 0 | MAX | 152 | 122 | 1.246 | Quarterfinals |
| 2 | Slovenia | 2 | 1 | 1 | 3 | 3 | 4 | 0.750 | 168 | 152 | 1.105 | Quarterfinals |
| 3 | Spain | 2 | 0 | 2 | 2 | 1 | 6 | 0.167 | 127 | 173 | 0.734 | 9th to 12th place |

| Date | Time | | Score | | Set 1 | Set 2 | Set 3 | Set 4 | Set 5 | Total | Report |
|---|---|---|---|---|---|---|---|---|---|---|---|
| 29 Mar | 19:30 | Slovenia | 3–1 | Spain | 23–25 | 25–18 | 25–15 | 25–17 | | 98–75 | Report |
| 30 Mar | 19:30 | Serbia and Montenegro | 3–0 | Slovenia | 25–22 | 25–23 | 27–25 | | | 77–70 | Report |
| 31 Mar | 19:30 | Spain | 0–3 | Serbia and Montenegro | 21–25 | 16–25 | 15–25 | | | 52–75 | Report |

== Final round ==
- All times are Eastern European Time (UTC+03:00)

=== Quarterfinals ===
| Date | Time | | Score | | Set 1 | Set 2 | Set 3 | Set 4 | Set 5 | Total | Report |
|---|---|---|---|---|---|---|---|---|---|---|---|
| 1 Apr | 12:00 | Poland | 3–0 | Bulgaria | 25–15 | 25–19 | 25–22 | | | 75–56 | Report |
| 1 Apr | 14:30 | France | 3–0 | Slovenia | 25–20 | 25–19 | 25–22 | | | 75–61 | Report |
| 1 Apr | 17:00 | Italy | 3–0 | Russia | 25–21 | 25–20 | 28–26 | | | 78–67 | Report |
| 1 Apr | 19:30 | Serbia and Montenegro | 2–3 | Slovakia | 16–25 | 14–25 | 25–16 | 25–20 | 11–15 | 91–101 | Report |

=== 9th to 12th place ===
9th to 12th Classification
1 April
Germany | 3
Estonia | 1
1 April
Latvia | 3
Spain | 0

9th place match
2 April
Germany | 2
Latvia | 3
11th place match
2 April
Estonia | 3
Spain | 0

==== 9th–12th place playoff ====
| Date | Time | | Score | | Set 1 | Set 2 | Set 3 | Set 4 | Set 5 | Total | Report |
|---|---|---|---|---|---|---|---|---|---|---|---|
| 2 Apr | 14:00 | Germany | 3–1 | Estonia | 22–25 | 25–14 | 25–23 | 25–20 | | 97–82 | Report |
| 2 Apr | 16:30 | Latvia | 3–0 | Spain | 27–25 | 25–19 | 25–23 | | | 77–67 | Report |

==== 11th place ====
| Date | Time | | Score | | Set 1 | Set 2 | Set 3 | Set 4 | Set 5 | Total | Report |
|---|---|---|---|---|---|---|---|---|---|---|---|
| 2 Apr | 14:00 | Estonia | 3–0 | Spain | 25–23 | 25–21 | 25–21 | | | 75–65 | Report |

==== 9th place ====
| Date | Time | | Score | | Set 1 | Set 2 | Set 3 | Set 4 | Set 5 | Total | Report |
|---|---|---|---|---|---|---|---|---|---|---|---|
| 2 Apr | 16:30 | Germany | 2–3 | Latvia | 27–25 | 21–25 | 10–25 | 25–22 | 10–15 | 93–112 | Report |

=== 5th to 8th place ===
5th to 8th Classification
2 April
Bulgaria | 3
Serbia and Montenegro | 1
2 April
Russia | 3
Slovenia | 0

5th place match
3 April
Bulgaria | 0
Russia | 3
7th place match
3 April
Serbia and Montenegro | 1
Slovenia | 3

==== 5th–8th place playoff ====
| Date | Time | | Score | | Set 1 | Set 2 | Set 3 | Set 4 | Set 5 | Total | Report |
|---|---|---|---|---|---|---|---|---|---|---|---|
| 2 Apr | 12:00 | Bulgaria | 3–1 | Serbia and Montenegro | 25–15 | 27–25 | 22–25 | 25–22 | | 99–87 | Report |
| 2 Apr | 14:30 | Russia | 3–0 | Slovenia | 32–30 | 25–16 | 25–22 | | | 82–68 | Report |

==== 7th place ====
| Date | Time | | Score | | Set 1 | Set 2 | Set 3 | Set 4 | Set 5 | Total | Report |
|---|---|---|---|---|---|---|---|---|---|---|---|
| 3 Apr | 12:00 | Serbia and Montenegro | 1–3 | Slovenia | 20–25 | 17–25 | 25–22 | 20–25 | | 82–97 | Report |

==== 5th place ====
| Date | Time | | Score | | Set 1 | Set 2 | Set 3 | Set 4 | Set 5 | Total | Report |
|---|---|---|---|---|---|---|---|---|---|---|---|
| 2 Apr | 12:00 | Bulgaria | 0–3 | Russia | 19–25 | 21–25 | 14–25 | | | 54–75 | Report |

=== Final round ===
Semifinals
2 April
Poland | 3
Slovakia | 1
2 April
Italy | 2
France | 3

Final
3 April
Poland | 3
France | 2
3rd place
3 April
Italy | 3
Slovakia | 0

==== Semifinal ====
| Date | Time | | Score | | Set 1 | Set 2 | Set 3 | Set 4 | Set 5 | Total | Report |
|---|---|---|---|---|---|---|---|---|---|---|---|
| 2 Apr | 17:00 | Poland | 3–1 | Slovakia | 25–18 | 25–27 | 25–20 | 25–20 | | 100–85 | Report |
| 2 Apr | 19:30 | Italy | 2–3 | France | 25–22 | 24–26 | 23–25 | 25–19 | 12–15 | 109–107 | Report |

==== 3rd place ====
| Date | Time | | Score | | Set 1 | Set 2 | Set 3 | Set 4 | Set 5 | Total | Report |
|---|---|---|---|---|---|---|---|---|---|---|---|
| 3 Apr | 17:00 | Slovakia | 0–3 | Italy | 14–25 | 14–25 | 22–25 | | | 50–75 | Report |

==== Final ====
| Date | Time | | Score | | Set 1 | Set 2 | Set 3 | Set 4 | Set 5 | Total | Report |
|---|---|---|---|---|---|---|---|---|---|---|---|
| 3 Apr | 19:30 | Poland | 3–2 | France | 25–23 | 25–23 | 21–25 | 13–25 | 15–12 | 99–108 | Report |

== Final standing ==
| Rank | Team |
|---|---|
| 1st place, gold medalist(s) | Poland |
| 2nd place, silver medalist(s) | France |
| 3rd place, bronze medalist(s) | Italy |
| 4 | Slovakia |
| 5 | Russia |
| 6 | Bulgaria |
| 7 | Slovenia |
| 8 | Serbia and Montenegro |
| 9 | Latvia |
| 10 | Germany |
| 11 | Estonia |
| 12 | Spain |

| Qualified for the 2005 Youth World Championship |

2005 Youth European champions

Poland
1st title

14–man Roster
Waldemar Kaczmarek, Grzegorz Łomacz, Michał Kamiński, Bartosz Kurek, Arkadiusz Świechowski, Mikołaj Sarnecki, Bartosz Janeczek, Jakub Jarosz, Zbigniew Bartman, Mateusz Gorzewski, Michał Chaberek, Adrian Stańczak
Head coach
Zdzisław Gogol

== Individual awards ==
- Most valuable player
  - (Poland) Jakub Jarosz
- Best spiker
  - (Poland) Bartosz Kurek
- Best blocker
  - (Italy) Michele Parusso
- Best server
  - (France) Emmanuel Ragondet
- Best setter
  - (Italy) Davide Saitta
- Best receiver
  - (France) Raphaël Mrozek
- Best libero
  - (Poland) Adrian Stańczak
