= 1997 FIVB Volleyball Boys' U19 World Championship =

1997 Boys' U19 World Championship

Tournament details
- Host country: Iran
- City: Tehran
- Dates: 14–22 August
- Teams: 16
- Venues: 2

Final positions
- Champions: Italy (1st title)

Tournament awards
- MVP: (Italy) Daniele Desiderio

The 1997 FIVB Volleyball Boys' U19 World Championship was held in Azadi Sport Complex, Tehran, Iran from 14 to 22 August 1997.

== Venues ==
- Azadi Volleyball Hall (Tehran)
- Azadi Indoor Stadium (Tehran)

== Preliminary round ==
=== Pool A ===
Pos	Team	Pld	W	L	Pts	SW	SL	SR	SPW	SPL	SPR	Qualification
1	France	3	3	0	6	9	1	9.000	143	75	1.907	Seeding group
2	Tunisia	3	2	1	5	7	4	1.750	146	107	1.364	Elimination group
3	Iran	3	1	2	4	4	6	0.667	108	118	0.915	Elimination group
4	Egypt	3	0	3	3	0	9	0.000	39	135	0.289	

Date		Score		Set 1	Set 2	Set 3	Set 4	Set 5	Total
14 Aug	Tunisia	1–3	France	15–7	8–15	14–16	7–15		44–53
14 Aug	Iran	3–0	Egypt	15–4	15–3	15–9			45–16
15 Aug	France	3–0	Egypt	15–3	15–4	15–3			45–10
15 Aug	Iran	1–3	Tunisia	15–12	11–15	12–15	4–15		42–57
16 Aug	Tunisia	3–0	Egypt	15–4	15–3	15–5			45–12
16 Aug	Iran	0–3	France	8–15	7–15	6–15			21–45

=== Pool B ===
Pos	Team	Pld	W	L	Pts	SW	SL	SR	SPW	SPL	SPR	Qualification
1	Italy	3	3	0	6	9	1	9.000	150	119	1.261	Seeding group
2	Dominican Republic	3	2	1	5	6	5	1.200	145	132	1.098	Elimination group
3	Greece	3	1	2	4	5	6	0.833	135	143	0.944	Elimination group
4	Venezuela	3	0	3	3	1	9	0.111	109	145	0.752	

Date		Score		Set 1	Set 2	Set 3	Set 4	Set 5	Total
14 Aug	Greece	1–3	Dominican Republic	15–12	6–15	14–16	7–15		42–58
14 Aug	Italy	3–0	Venezuela	15–12	16–14	15–12			46–38
15 Aug	Venezuela	0–3	Greece	10–15	9–15	7–15			26–45
15 Aug	Italy	3–0	Dominican Republic	15–11	15–12	15–10			45–33
16 Aug	Dominican Republic	3–1	Venezuela	15–12	9–15	15–10	15–8		54–45
16 Aug	Italy	3–1	Greece	15–10	17–15	12–15	15–8		59–48

=== Pool C ===
Pos	Team	Pld	W	L	Pts	SW	SL	SR	SPW	SPL	SPR	Qualification
1	Brazil	3	3	0	6	9	1	9.000	153	103	1.485	Seeding group
2	South Korea	3	2	1	5	7	3	2.333	146	116	1.259	Elimination group
3	Czech Republic	3	1	2	4	3	7	0.429	112	137	0.818	Elimination group
4	Chinese Taipei	3	0	3	3	1	9	0.111	86	141	0.610	

Date		Score		Set 1	Set 2	Set 3	Set 4	Set 5	Total
14 Aug	Chinese Taipei	0–3	South Korea	4–15	13–15	12–15			29–45
14 Aug	Brazil	3–0	Czech Republic	17–15	15–9	15–11			47–35
15 Aug	Chinese Taipei	1–3	Czech Republic	12–15	14–16	15–5	4–15		45–51
15 Aug	Brazil	3–1	South Korea	15–13	16–14	15–17	15–12		61–56
16 Aug	Czech Republic	0–3	South Korea	12–15	10–15	4–15			26–45
16 Aug	Brazil	3–0	Chinese Taipei	15–2	15–6	15–4			45–12

=== Pool D ===
Pos	Team	Pld	W	L	Pts	SW	SL	SR	SPW	SPL	SPR	Qualification
1	Japan	3	2	1	5	8	3	2.667	156	113	1.381	Seeding group
2	Cuba	3	2	1	5	6	4	1.500	125	121	1.033	Elimination group
3	Poland	3	2	1	5	6	5	1.200	144	127	1.134	Elimination group
4	Slovakia	3	0	3	3	1	9	0.111	83	147	0.565	

Date		Score		Set 1	Set 2	Set 3	Set 4	Set 5	Total
14 Aug	Japan	3–0	Slovakia	15–10	15–12	15–5			45–27
14 Aug	Cuba	3–0	Poland	15–13	15–12	15–11			45–36
15 Aug	Poland	3–2	Japan	15–9	15–13	9–15	9–15	15–13	63–65
15 Aug	Cuba	3–1	Slovakia	15–8	15–6	12–15	15–10		57–39
16 Aug	Poland	3–0	Slovakia	15–3	15–3	15–11			45–17
16 Aug	Cuba	0–3	Japan	3–15	6–15	14–16			23–46

== Play-off ==
=== Seeding group ===
Date		Score		Set 1	Set 2	Set 3	Set 4	Set 5	Total
18 Aug	Italy	0–3	Brazil	9–15	12–15	3–15			24–45
18 Aug	Japan	3–2	France	15–4	15–6	12–15	16–17	15–6	73–48

=== Elimination group ===
Date		Score		Set 1	Set 2	Set 3	Set 4	Set 5	Total
18 Aug	South Korea	1–3	Poland	5–15	10–15	16–14	4–15		35–59
18 Aug	Cuba	2–3	Czech Republic	13–15	15–3	10–15	15–11	7–15	60–59
18 Aug	Tunisia	0–3	Greece	8–15	10–15	14–16			32–46
18 Aug	Iran	2–3	Dominican Republic	15–10	10–15	8–15	17–15	13–15	63–70

== Final round ==
=== Championship ===
Quarterfinals
20 August – Tehran
Czech Republic	0
Italy	3
20 August – Tehran
Japan	3
Dominican Republic	1
20 August – Tehran
Poland	3
Brazil	2
20 August – Tehran
France	0
Greece	3

Semifinals
21 August – Tehran
Italy	3
Japan	0
21 August – Tehran
Poland	2
Greece	3

Final
22 August – Tehran
Italy	3
Greece	0
3rd place
22 August – Tehran
Japan	3
Poland	2

Date		Score		Set 1	Set 2	Set 3	Set 4	Set 5	Total
20 Aug	Poland	3–2	Brazil	3–15	15–11	11–15	15–11	15–11	59–63
20 Aug	Czech Republic	0–3	Italy	12–15	8–15	10–15			30–45
20 Aug	Japan	3–1	Dominican Republic	11–15	15–4	15–6	15–12		56–37
20 Aug	France	0–3	Greece	4–15	4–15	5–15			13–45

Date		Score		Set 1	Set 2	Set 3	Set 4	Set 5	Total
21 Aug	Italy	3–0	Japan	15–10	15–7	15–13			45–30
21 Aug	Poland	2–3	Greece	14–16	15–11	11–15	15–13	12–15	67–70

Date		Score		Set 1	Set 2	Set 3	Set 4	Set 5	Total
22 Aug	Japan	3–2	Poland	7–15	15–12	15–6	13–15	15–12	65–60
22 Aug	Italy	3–0	Greece	15–4	15–11	15–6			45–21

=== Classification 5th–8th ===
5th–8th places
21 August – Tehran
Czech Republic	3
Dominican Republic	1
21 August – Tehran
Brazil	3
France	0

5th place
22 August – Tehran
Czech Republic	0
Brazil	3
7th place
22 August – Tehran
Dominican Republic	0
France	3

Date		Score		Set 1	Set 2	Set 3	Set 4	Set 5	Total
21 Aug	Brazil	3–0	France	15–6	15–8	15–8			45–22
21 Aug	Czech Republic	3–1	Dominican Republic	15–3	15–8	10–15	15–10		55–36

Date		Score		Set 1	Set 2	Set 3	Set 4	Set 5	Total
22 Aug	Dominican Republic	0–3	France	7–15	11–15	6–15			24–45
22 Aug	Czech Republic	0–3	Brazil	12–15	11–25	4–15			27–45

== Final standing ==
Rank	Team
1st place, gold medalist(s)	Italy
2nd place, silver medalist(s)	Greece
3rd place, bronze medalist(s)	Japan
4	Poland
5	Brazil
6	Czech Republic
7	France
8	Dominican Republic
9	Tunisia
9	Iran
9	South Korea
9	Cuba
13	Chinese Taipei
13	Egypt
13	Slovakia
13	Venezuela

1997 Boys' U19 World champions

Italy
1st title

Team Roster
Giacomo Sintini, Daniele Desiderio, Luca Tencati, Mauro Gavotto, Andrea Bari, Paolo Cozzi, Daniele Sottile, Gabriele Buccioli, Alberto Peruzzo, Giacomo Rigoni, Lorenzo Bonini, Michele Cerrato
Head Coach: Fausto Polidori

== Awards ==
- MVP: (Italy) Daniele Desiderio
- Best spiker: (Italy) Daniele Desiderio
- Best blocker: (Italy) Paolo Cozzi
- Best server: (Czech Republic) Michal Rak
- Best digger: (Dominican Republic) José Manuel Genao
- Best setter: (Brazil) William Arjona
