= 2003 FIVB Volleyball Boys' U19 World Championship =

2003 Boys' U19 World Championship

Tournament details
- Host country: Thailand
- Dates: 5–13 July
- Teams: 16
- Venues: 2 (in 1 host city)

Final positions
- Champions: Brazil (6th title)

The 2003 FIVB Volleyball Boys' U19 World Championship was held in Suphanburi, Thailand from 5 to 13 July 2003.

== Competing nations ==
The following national teams have qualified:

| Pool A | Pool B | Pool C | Pool D |
|---|---|---|---|
| Thailand; Venezuela; Australia; Puerto Rico | Slovakia; Egypt; Russia; China | Poland; Czech Republic; Brazil; India | Italy; Morocco; Iran; Netherlands |

== Venues ==
- Chaopha Gymnasium (Suphanburi) – Pool C, D
- Silpa-Archa Gymnasium (Suphanburi) – Pool A, B

== Preliminary round ==
=== Pool A ===
| Pos | Team | Pld | W | L | Pts | SW | SL | SR | SPW | SPL | SPR | Qualification |
|---|---|---|---|---|---|---|---|---|---|---|---|---|
| 1 | Australia | 3 | 3 | 0 | 6 | 9 | 4 | 2.250 | 283 | 265 | 1.068 | Seeding group |
| 2 | Puerto Rico | 3 | 2 | 1 | 5 | 8 | 4 | 2.000 | 274 | 258 | 1.062 | Elimination group |
| 3 | Thailand | 3 | 1 | 2 | 4 | 3 | 7 | 0.429 | 216 | 234 | 0.923 | Elimination group |
| 4 | Venezuela | 3 | 0 | 3 | 3 | 4 | 9 | 0.444 | 278 | 294 | 0.946 | |

| Date | | Score | | Set 1 | Set 2 | Set 3 | Set 4 | Set 5 | Total |
|---|---|---|---|---|---|---|---|---|---|
| 05 Jul | Venezuela | 2–3 | Australia | 25–22 | 25–18 | 21–25 | 18–25 | 13–15 | 102–105 |
| 05 Jul | Thailand | 0–3 | Puerto Rico | 22–25 | 20–25 | 21–25 | | | 63–75 |
| 06 Jul | Puerto Rico | 2–3 | Australia | 25–20 | 22–25 | 25–18 | 22–25 | 10–15 | 104–103 |
| 06 Jul | Thailand | 3–1 | Venezuela | 25–19 | 19–25 | 25–20 | 25–20 | | 94–84 |
| 07 Jul | Venezuela | 1–3 | Puerto Rico | 25–20 | 23–25 | 21–25 | 23–25 | | 92–95 |
| 07 Jul | Thailand | 0–3 | Australia | 21–25 | 20–25 | 18–25 | | | 59–75 |

=== Pool B ===
| Pos | Team | Pld | W | L | Pts | SW | SL | SR | SPW | SPL | SPR | Qualification |
|---|---|---|---|---|---|---|---|---|---|---|---|---|
| 1 | Russia | 3 | 3 | 0 | 6 | 9 | 0 | MAX | 228 | 176 | 1.295 | Seeding group |
| 2 | China | 3 | 2 | 1 | 5 | 6 | 6 | 1.000 | 263 | 270 | 0.974 | Elimination group |
| 3 | Egypt | 3 | 1 | 2 | 4 | 5 | 6 | 0.833 | 236 | 249 | 0.948 | Elimination group |
| 4 | Slovakia | 3 | 0 | 3 | 3 | 1 | 9 | 0.111 | 225 | 257 | 0.875 | |

| Date | | Score | | Set 1 | Set 2 | Set 3 | Set 4 | Set 5 | Total |
|---|---|---|---|---|---|---|---|---|---|
| 05 Jul | Slovakia | 1–3 | China | 26–24 | 24–26 | 23–25 | 20–25 | | 93–100 |
| 05 Jul | Egypt | 0–3 | Russia | 17–25 | 15–25 | 23–25 | | | 55–75 |
| 06 Jul | Slovakia | 0–3 | Egypt | 22–25 | 22–25 | 27–29 | | | 71–79 |
| 06 Jul | China | 0–3 | Russia | 22–25 | 15–25 | 23–25 | | | 60–75 |
| 07 Jul | Egypt | 2–3 | China | 21–25 | 21–25 | 25–15 | 25–23 | 10–15 | 102–103 |
| 07 Jul | Russia | 3–0 | Slovakia | 28–26 | 25–18 | 25–17 | | | 76–61 |

=== Pool C ===
| Pos | Team | Pld | W | L | Pts | SW | SL | SR | SPW | SPL | SPR | Qualification |
|---|---|---|---|---|---|---|---|---|---|---|---|---|
| 1 | India | 3 | 3 | 0 | 6 | 9 | 1 | 9.000 | 248 | 195 | 1.272 | Seeding group |
| 2 | Brazil | 3 | 2 | 1 | 5 | 7 | 4 | 1.750 | 256 | 223 | 1.148 | Elimination group |
| 3 | Czech Republic | 3 | 1 | 2 | 4 | 3 | 6 | 0.500 | 178 | 212 | 0.840 | Elimination group |
| 4 | Poland | 3 | 0 | 3 | 3 | 1 | 9 | 0.111 | 195 | 247 | 0.789 | |

| Date | | Score | | Set 1 | Set 2 | Set 3 | Set 4 | Set 5 | Total |
|---|---|---|---|---|---|---|---|---|---|
| 05 Jul | Poland | 0–3 | India | 24–26 | 20–25 | 14–25 | | | 58–76 |
| 05 Jul | Czech Republic | 0–3 | Brazil | 14–25 | 14–25 | 23–25 | | | 51–75 |
| 06 Jul | Poland | 0–3 | Czech Republic | 22–25 | 18–25 | 22–25 | | | 62–79 |
| 06 Jul | India | 3–1 | Brazil | 25–19 | 25–21 | 22–25 | 25–20 | | 97–85 |
| 07 Jul | Czech Republic | 0–3 | India | 20–25 | 15–25 | 17–25 | | | 52–75 |
| 07 Jul | Brazil | 3–1 | Poland | 21–25 | 25–17 | 25–14 | 25–19 | | 96–75 |

=== Pool D ===
| Pos | Team | Pld | W | L | Pts | SW | SL | SR | SPW | SPL | SPR | Qualification |
|---|---|---|---|---|---|---|---|---|---|---|---|---|
| 1 | Iran | 3 | 3 | 0 | 6 | 9 | 1 | 9.000 | 249 | 211 | 1.180 | Seeding group |
| 2 | Netherlands | 3 | 2 | 1 | 5 | 6 | 4 | 1.500 | 233 | 225 | 1.036 | Elimination group |
| 3 | Italy | 3 | 1 | 2 | 4 | 5 | 6 | 0.833 | 251 | 240 | 1.046 | Elimination group |
| 4 | Morocco | 3 | 0 | 3 | 3 | 0 | 9 | 0.000 | 168 | 225 | 0.747 | |

| Date | | Score | | Set 1 | Set 2 | Set 3 | Set 4 | Set 5 | Total |
|---|---|---|---|---|---|---|---|---|---|
| 05 Jul | Morocco | 0–3 | Iran | 22–25 | 15–25 | 23–25 | | | 60–75 |
| 05 Jul | Italy | 1–3 | Netherlands | 23–25 | 25–20 | 22–25 | 18–25 | | 88–95 |
| 06 Jul | Netherlands | 0–3 | Iran | 21–25 | 21–25 | 21–25 | | | 63–75 |
| 06 Jul | Italy | 3–0 | Morocco | 25–15 | 25–15 | 25–16 | | | 75–46 |
| 07 Jul | Morocco | 0–3 | Netherlands | 20–25 | 21–25 | 21–25 | | | 62–75 |
| 07 Jul | Iran | 3–1 | Italy | 25–22 | 24–26 | 25–21 | 25–19 | | 99–88 |

== Play-off ==
=== Seeding group ===
| Date | | Score | | Set 1 | Set 2 | Set 3 | Set 4 | Set 5 | Total |
|---|---|---|---|---|---|---|---|---|---|
| 09 Jul | Russia | 3–0 | Iran | 25–23 | 25–23 | 25–16 | | | 75–62 |
| 09 Jul | Australia | 0–3 | India | 17–25 | 17–25 | 14–25 | | | 48–75 |

=== Elimination group ===
| Date | | Score | | Set 1 | Set 2 | Set 3 | Set 4 | Set 5 | Total |
|---|---|---|---|---|---|---|---|---|---|
| 09 Jul | China | 1–3 | Thailand | 25–21 | 14–25 | 21–25 | 20–25 | | 80–96 |
| 09 Jul | Puerto Rico | 3–0 | Egypt | 25–21 | 25–16 | 25–23 | | | 75–60 |
| 09 Jul | Brazil | 3–0 | Italy | 25–23 | 25–20 | 25–18 | | | 75–61 |
| 09 Jul | Netherlands | 1–3 | Czech Republic | 23–25 | 25–23 | 20–25 | 14–25 | | 82–98 |

== Final round ==
=== Championship ===
Quarterfinals
11 July – Suphanburi
Czech Republic | 3
Australia | 1
11 July – Suphanburi
Russia | 2
Brazil | 3
11 July – Suphanburi
Iran | 3
Thailand | 0
11 July – Suphanburi
Puerto Rico | 0
India | 3

Semifinals
12 July – Suphanburi
Czech Republic | 0
Brazil | 3
12 July – Suphanburi
Iran | 1
India | 3

Final
13 July – Suphanburi
Brazil | 3
India | 0
3rd place
13 July – Suphanburi
Czech Republic | 1
Iran | 3

| Date | | Score | | Set 1 | Set 2 | Set 3 | Set 4 | Set 5 | Total |
|---|---|---|---|---|---|---|---|---|---|
| 11 Jul | Czech Republic | 3–1 | Australia | 20–25 | 25–16 | 25–18 | 25–19 | | 95–78 |
| 11 Jul | Iran | 3–0 | Thailand | 25–16 | 25–22 | 25–19 | | | 75–57 |
| 11 Jul | Russia | 2–3 | Brazil | 22–25 | 25–17 | 19–25 | 25–20 | 15–17 | 106–104 |
| 11 Jul | Puerto Rico | 0–3 | India | 17–25 | 14–25 | 11–25 | | | 42–75 |

| Date | | Score | | Set 1 | Set 2 | Set 3 | Set 4 | Set 5 | Total |
|---|---|---|---|---|---|---|---|---|---|
| 12 Jul | Czech Republic | 0–3 | Brazil | 20–25 | 20–25 | 19–25 | | | 59–75 |
| 12 Jul | Iran | 1–3 | India | 15–25 | 25–23 | 17–25 | 20–25 | | 77–98 |

| Date | | Score | | Set 1 | Set 2 | Set 3 | Set 4 | Set 5 | Total |
|---|---|---|---|---|---|---|---|---|---|
| 13 Jul | Czech Republic | 1–3 | Iran | 21–25 | 25–20 | 21–25 | 18–25 | | 85–95 |
| 13 Jul | Brazil | 3–0 | India | 25–22 | 26–24 | 25–19 | | | 76–65 |

=== Classification 5th–8th ===
5th–8th places
12 July – Suphanburi
Australia | 0
Russia | 3
12 July – Suphanburi
Thailand | 3
Puerto Rico | 1

5th place
13 July – Suphanburi
Russia | 3
Thailand | 1
7th place
13 July – Suphanburi
Australia | 0
Puerto Rico | 3

| Date | | Score | | Set 1 | Set 2 | Set 3 | Set 4 | Set 5 | Total |
|---|---|---|---|---|---|---|---|---|---|
| 12 Jul | Australia | 0–3 | Russia | 14–25 | 14–25 | 17–25 | | | 45–75 |
| 12 Jul | Thailand | 3–1 | Puerto Rico | 23–25 | 25–22 | 31–29 | 25–14 | | 104–90 |

| Date | | Score | | Set 1 | Set 2 | Set 3 | Set 4 | Set 5 | Total |
|---|---|---|---|---|---|---|---|---|---|
| 13 Jul | Australia | 0–3 | Puerto Rico | 23–25 | 24–26 | 28–30 | | | 75–81 |
| 13 Jul | Russia | 3–1 | Thailand | 25–27 | 25–19 | 25–19 | 25–21 | | 100–86 |

== Final standing ==
| Rank | Team |
|---|---|
| 1st place, gold medalist(s) | Brazil |
| 2nd place, silver medalist(s) | India |
| 3rd place, bronze medalist(s) | Iran |
| 4 | Czech Republic |
| 5 | Russia |
| 6 | Thailand |
| 7 | Puerto Rico |
| 8 | Australia |
| 9 | China |
| 9 | Egypt |
| 9 | Italy |
| 9 | Netherlands |
| 13 | Morocco |
| 13 | Poland |
| 13 | Slovakia |
| 13 | Venezuela |

2003 Boys' U19 World champions

Brazil
6th title

Team Roster
Douglas Silva Mendes Barboza, Luiz Araújo Zech Coelho, Thiago Machado, Thiago Firmino da Silva, Victor Gabriel da Silva Gonçalves, Fábio Luiz Malachias Paes, Breno Vasconcelos de Oliveira, Danilo Cruz de Carvalho, Igor Braz Vilela Pinto, Moyses Cizotto Keller, Silmar Antônio de Almeida, Everaldo Lucena da Silva
Head Coach: Percy Oncken

== Awards ==
- Best scorer: (Iran) Mohammad Soleimani
- Best spiker: (Russia) Roman Danilov
- Best blocker: (Brazil) Danilo
- Best server: (Russia) Aleksey Ostapenko
- Best setter: (India) Ramaswami Kamraj
- Best digger: (Puerto Rico) Edgardo Hernández
- Best receiver: (Iran) Moslem Mohammadizadeh
