= 2001 FIVB Volleyball Boys' U19 World Championship =

2001 Boys' U19 World Championship

Tournament details
- Host country: Egypt
- Dates: 22–30 September
- Teams: 16
- Venues: 2 (in 1 host city)

Final positions
- Champions: Brazil (5th title)

Tournament awards
- MVP: (Iran) Mohammad Soleimani

The 2001 FIVB Volleyball Boys' U19 World Championship took place from 22 to 30 September in the Egyptian capital Cairo.

== Preliminary round ==
=== Pool A ===
Pos	Team	Pld	W	L	Pts	SW	SL	SR	SPW	SPL	SPR	Qualification
1	Poland	3	3	0	6	9	0	MAX	225	159	1.415	Seeding group
2	Egypt	3	2	1	5	6	4	1.500	227	213	1.066	Elimination group
3	Czech Republic	3	1	2	4	4	6	0.667	0	0	—	Elimination group
4	Sudan	3	0	3	3	0	9	0.000	0	0	—	

Date		Score		Set 1	Set 2	Set 3	Set 4	Set 5	Total
22 Sep	Czech Republic	0–3	Poland	23–25	12–25	20–25			55–75
22 Sep	Egypt	3–0	Sudan	25–15	25–17	25–23			75–55
23 Sep	Poland	3–0	Sudan	25–16	25–18	25–19			75–53
23 Sep	Czech Republic	1–3	Egypt	18–25	20–25	28–26	17–25		83–101
24 Sep	Egypt	0–3	Poland	17–25	20–25	14–25			51–75
24 Sep	Sudan	0–3	Czech Republic						

=== Pool B ===
Pos	Team	Pld	W	L	Pts	SW	SL	SR	SPW	SPL	SPR	Qualification
1	France	2	2	0	4	6	1	6.000	168	145	1.159	Seeding group
2	Iran	2	1	1	3	4	3	1.333	160	151	1.060	Elimination group
3	Chinese Taipei	2	0	2	2	0	6	0.000	122	154	0.792	Elimination group
–	Italy	0	0	0	0	0	0	—	0	0	—	

Date		Score		Set 1	Set 2	Set 3	Set 4	Set 5	Total
22 Sep	France	3–0	Chinese Taipei	25–21	25–20	25–23			75–64
23 Sep	Chinese Taipei	0–3	Iran	14–25	17–25	27–29			58–79
24 Sep	Iran	1–3	France	23–25	15–25	25–18	18–25		81–93

=== Pool C ===
Pos	Team	Pld	W	L	Pts	SW	SL	SR	SPW	SPL	SPR	Qualification
1	Russia	3	3	0	6	9	2	4.500	269	229	1.175	Seeding group
2	South Korea	3	2	1	5	7	4	1.750	254	239	1.063	Elimination group
3	Venezuela	3	1	2	4	4	8	0.500	245	282	0.869	Elimination group
4	Slovakia	3	0	3	3	3	9	0.333	266	284	0.937	

Date		Score		Set 1	Set 2	Set 3	Set 4	Set 5	Total
22 Sep	Slovakia	1–3	South Korea	25–22	22–25	23–25	18–25		88–97
22 Sep	Russia	3–1	Venezuela	21–25	25–23	25–15	25–17		96–80
23 Sep	South Korea	3–0	Venezuela	25–21	25–23	25–12			75–56
23 Sep	Slovakia	0–3	Russia	19–25	22–25	26–28			67–78
24 Sep	Russia	3–1	South Korea	25–20	20–25	25–19	25–18		95–82
24 Sep	Venezuela	3–2	Slovakia	21–25	25–23	18–25	30–28	15–10	109–111

=== Pool D ===
Pos	Team	Pld	W	L	Pts	SW	SL	SR	SPW	SPL	SPR	Qualification
1	Brazil	3	3	0	6	9	0	MAX	225	151	1.490	Seeding group
2	Tunisia	3	2	1	5	6	6	1.000	252	261	0.966	Elimination group
3	Argentina	3	1	2	4	5	6	0.833	229	243	0.942	Elimination group
4	Mexico	3	0	3	3	1	9	0.111	189	240	0.788	

Date		Score		Set 1	Set 2	Set 3	Set 4	Set 5	Total
22 Sep	Mexico	0–3	Brazil	16–25	11–25	21–25			48–75
22 Sep	Argentina	2–3	Tunisia	20–25	22–25	25–22	25–23	11–15	103–110
23 Sep	Brazil	3–0	Tunisia	25–22	25–16	25–14			75–52
23 Sep	Mexico	0–3	Argentina	17–25	20–25	21–25			58–75
24 Sep	Argentina	0–3	Brazil	10–25	19–25	22–25			51–75
24 Sep	Tunisia	3–1	Mexico	25–22	25–22	15–25	25–14		90–83

== Play-off ==
=== Seeding group ===
Date		Score		Set 1	Set 2	Set 3	Set 4	Set 5	Total
26 Sep	Russia	3–2	France	21–25	25–22	21–25	25–14	15–9	107–95
26 Sep	Poland	1–3	Brazil	25–22	20–25	23–25	17–25		85–97

=== Elimination group ===
Date		Score		Set 1	Set 2	Set 3	Set 4	Set 5	Total
26 Sep	Chinese Taipei	0–3	Tunisia	25–27	23–25	13–25			61–77
26 Sep	South Korea	3–0	Czech Republic	25–18	25–21	25–23			75–62
26 Sep	Venezuela	1–3	Iran	19–25	19–25	25–23	21–25		84–98
26 Sep	Egypt	3–0	Argentina	25–12	25–22	25–19			75–53

== Final round ==
=== Championship ===
Quarterfinals
28 September – Cairo
Russia	3
Tunisia	1
28 September – Cairo
Iran	3
Poland	1
28 September – Cairo
France	2
Egypt	3
28 September – Cairo
South Korea	0
Brazil	3

Semifinals
29 September – Cairo
Russia	0
Iran	3
29 September – Cairo
Egypt	0
Brazil	3

Final
30 September – Cairo
Iran	0
Brazil	3
3rd place
30 September – Cairo
Russia	3
Egypt	0

Date		Score		Set 1	Set 2	Set 3	Set 4	Set 5	Total
28 Sep	Russia	3–1	Tunisia	23–25	26–24	25–21	25–20		99–90
28 Sep	Iran	3–1	Poland	19–25	25–14	25–20	25–20		94–79
28 Sep	South Korea	0–3	Brazil	20–25	21–25	19–25			60–75
28 Sep	France	2–3	Egypt	25–17	34–36	25–19	22–25	8–15	114–112

Date		Score		Set 1	Set 2	Set 3	Set 4	Set 5	Total
29 Sep	Russia	0–3	Iran	15–25	20–25	27–29			62–79
29 Sep	Egypt	0–3	Brazil	14–25	20–25	14–25			48–75

Date		Score		Set 1	Set 2	Set 3	Set 4	Set 5	Total
30 Sep	Russia	3–0	Egypt	25–15	25–10	25–22			75–47
30 Sep	Iran	0–3	Brazil	16–25	16–25	18–25			50–75

=== Classification 5th–8th ===
5th–8th places
29 September – Cairo
Tunisia	0
Poland	3
29 September – Cairo
France	1
South Korea	3

5th place
30 September – Cairo
Poland	3
South Korea	1
7th place
30 September – Cairo
Tunisia	1
France	3

Date		Score		Set 1	Set 2	Set 3	Set 4	Set 5	Total
29 Sep	Tunisia	0–3	Poland	18–25	24–26	23–25			65–76
29 Sep	France	1–3	South Korea	25–18	21–25	15–25	21–25		82–93

Date		Score		Set 1	Set 2	Set 3	Set 4	Set 5	Total
30 Sep	Tunisia	1–3	France	15–25	27–29	25–19	20–25		87–98
30 Sep	Poland	3–1	South Korea	22–25	25–22	28–26	25–21		100–94

== Final standing ==
Rank	Team
1st place, gold medalist(s)	Brazil
2nd place, silver medalist(s)	Iran
3rd place, bronze medalist(s)	Russia
4	Egypt
5	Poland
6	South Korea
7	France
8	Tunisia
9	Argentina
9	Chinese Taipei
9	Czech Republic
9	Venezuela
13	Italy
13	Mexico
13	Slovakia
13	Sudan

2001 Boys' U19 World champions

Brazil
5th title

== Awards ==
- MVP: (Iran) Mohammad Soleimani
- Best spiker: (Brazil) Bruno Zanuto
- Best blocker: (Russia) Aleksandr Abrossimov
- Best server: (Egypt) Abdalsalam Abdallah
- Best setter: (Tunisia) Seifeddine Lamjed
- Best digger: (South Korea) Kwak Dong-Hyuk
- Best receiver: (Iran) Farhad Zarif
