= Volleyball at the 2010 Summer Youth Olympics – Boys' tournament =

Boys' Volleyball at the I Summer Youth Olympic Games
- Date: 21–26 August

Medalists
1st place, gold medalist(s)		Cuba
2nd place, silver medalist(s)		Argentina
3rd place, bronze medalist(s)		Russia

The 2010 Boys' Youth Olympic Volleyball Tournament was the 1st edition of the event, organized by the world's governing body, the FIVB in conjunction with the IOC. It was held in Singapore from 21 to 26 August 2010.

== Pools composition ==
Pool A	Pool B
Serbia; Russia; DR Congo	Argentina; Cuba; Iran

== Venue ==
- Toa Payoh Sports Hall, Singapore

== Preliminary round ==
- All times are Singapore Standard Time (UTC+08:00).

=== Pool A ===
Pos	Team	Pld	W	L	Pts	SW	SL	SR	SPW	SPL	SPR	Qualification
1	Russia	2	2	0	4	6	0	MAX	150	99	1.515	Semifinals
2	Serbia	2	1	1	3	3	4	0.750	146	154	0.948	Semifinals
3	DR Congo	2	0	2	2	1	6	0.167	129	172	0.750	5th place match

Date	Time		Score		Set 1	Set 2	Set 3	Set 4	Set 5	Total	Report
21 Aug	10:00	Serbia	3–1	DR Congo	25–15	25–18	22–25	25–21		97–79	P2
22 Aug	12:30	Serbia	0–3	Russia	17–25	20–25	12–25			49–75	P2
23 Aug	10:00	DR Congo	0–3	Russia	22–25	15–25	13–25			50–75	P2

=== Pool B ===
Pos	Team	Pld	W	L	Pts	SW	SL	SR	SPW	SPL	SPR	Qualification
1	Cuba	2	2	0	4	6	1	6.000	171	156	1.096	Semifinals
2	Argentina	2	1	1	3	3	3	1.000	147	123	1.195	Semifinals
3	Iran	2	0	2	2	1	6	0.167	136	175	0.777	5th place match

Date	Time		Score		Set 1	Set 2	Set 3	Set 4	Set 5	Total	Report
21 Aug	18:00	Argentina	3–0	Iran	25–12	25–9	29–27			79–48	P2
22 Aug	15:30	Argentina	0–3	Cuba	22–25	23–25	23–25			68–75	P2
23 Aug	18:00	Iran	1–3	Cuba	25–21	22–25	19–25	22–25		88–96	P2

== Final round ==
- All times are Singapore Standard Time (UTC+08:00).

=== 5th–6th places ===
==== 5th place match ====
Date	Time		Score		Set 1	Set 2	Set 3	Set 4	Set 5	Total	Report
25 Aug	10:00	DR Congo	0–3	Iran	9–25	15–25	17–25			41–75	P2

=== Championship ===
Semifinals
24 August
Russia	0
Argentina	3
24 August
Cuba	3
Serbia	0

Gold medal match
26 August
Argentina	1
Cuba	3
Bronze medal match
25 August
Russia	3
Serbia	0

==== Semifinals ====
Date	Time		Score		Set 1	Set 2	Set 3	Set 4	Set 5	Total	Report
24 Aug	12:30	Russia	0–3	Argentina	10–25	16–25	19–25			45–75	P2
24 Aug	15:30	Cuba	3–0	Serbia	25–22	25–19	25–22			75–63	P2

==== Bronze medal match ====
Date	Time		Score		Set 1	Set 2	Set 3	Set 4	Set 5	Total	Report
25 Aug	18:10	Russia	3–0	Serbia	25–17	25–17	25–15			75–49	P2

==== Gold medal match ====
Date	Time		Score		Set 1	Set 2	Set 3	Set 4	Set 5	Total	Report
26 Aug	11:30	Argentina	1–3	Cuba	23–25	21–25	25–17	20–25		89–92	P2

== Final standing ==
Rank	Team
1st place, gold medalist(s)	Cuba
2nd place, silver medalist(s)	Argentina
3rd place, bronze medalist(s)	Russia
4	Serbia
5	Iran
6	DR Congo

2010 Boys' Youth Olympic champions

Cuba
1st title

10–boy Roster
León, González, Araujo, J. León, Lamadrid (c), Garcia (L), Duran, Albo, Loyola, Perdomo
Head coach
Sánchez

== Medalists ==
Gold	Silver	Bronze
Cuba Wilfredo León; Alejandro González; Calos Araujo; Juan Andres León; Alexis Lamadrid (c); Yonder Garcia (L); Yulian Duran; Daniel Albo; Nelson Loyola; Yassel Perdomo Head coach: Rodolfo Sánchez	Argentina Mauro Llanos; Luciano Verasio; Leonardo Plaza; Frederico Martina; Gonzalo Lapera; Ramiro Nunez; Esteban Martínez; Gonzalo Quiroga (c); Tomás Ruiz (L); Ezequiel Palacios; Nicolas Mendez; Damian Villalba Head coach: Juan Manuel	Russia Vladimir Manerov; Bogdan Glivenko; Ivan Komarov; Dmitriy Solodilin (L); Valentin Golubev; Aleksandr Shchurin; Filipp Mokievskiy; Aleksey Tertyshnikov; Konstantin Osipov (c); Ilya Nikitin; Vadim Zolotukhin; Maxim Kulikov Head coach: Andrey Kukushkin
