= 2007 Boys' Youth European Volleyball Championship =

2007 Boys' U19 Volleyball European Championship
Tournament details
- Host country: Austria
- Dates: 11–16 April
- Teams: 12
- Venues: 2 (in 2 host cities)

Final positions
- Champions: France (1st title)

Tournament awards
- MVP: (France) Guillaume Quesque

The 2007 Boys' Youth European Volleyball Championship was played in Austria from 11 to 16 April 2007. The top two teams were qualified for the 2007 Youth World Championship.

== Participating teams ==
- Hosts
  - Austria
- Qualified through 2007 Boys' Youth European Volleyball Championship Qualification
  - Belgium
  - Estonia
  - France
  - Germany
  - Italy
  - Latvia
  - Netherlands
  - Poland
  - Russia
  - Serbia
  - Turkey

== Pools composition ==
Pool A	Pool B	Pool C	Pool D
Belgium	Germany	Estonia	Austria
Latvia	Serbia	Italy	France
Poland	Turkey	Netherlands	Russia

== Preliminary round ==
=== Pool A ===
Pos	Team	Pld	W	L	Pts	SW	SL	SR	SPW	SPL	SPR	Qualification
1	Belgium	2	2	0	6	6	2	3.000	199	180	1.106	Quarterfinals
2	Poland	2	1	1	3	4	3	1.333	163	162	1.006	Quarterfinals
3	Latvia	2	0	2	0	1	6	0.167	153	173	0.884	9th–12th Semifinals

Date	Time		Score		Set 1	Set 2	Set 3	Set 4	Set 5	Total	Report
11 Apr	12:30	Latvia	1–3	Belgium	23–25	21–25	25–23	23–25		92–98	Report
12 Apr	12:30	Poland	3–0	Latvia	25–19	25–20	25–22			75–61	Report
13 Apr	12:30	Belgium	3–1	Poland	25–16	25–21	25–27	26–24		101–88	Report

=== Pool B ===
Pos	Team	Pld	W	L	Pts	SW	SL	SR	SPW	SPL	SPR	Qualification
1	Germany	2	2	0	6	6	1	6.000	174	134	1.299	Quarterfinals
2	Serbia	2	1	1	3	3	4	0.750	156	174	0.897	Quarterfinals
3	Turkey	2	0	2	0	2	6	0.333	180	202	0.891	9th–12th Semifinals

Date	Time		Score		Set 1	Set 2	Set 3	Set 4	Set 5	Total	Report
11 Apr	15:15	Turkey	1–3	Serbia	23–25	24–26	27–25	25–27		99–103	Report
12 Apr	15:15	Germany	3–1	Turkey	24–26	25–23	25–15	25–17		99–81	Report
13 Apr	15:15	Serbia	0–3	Germany	21–25	14–25	18–25			53–75	Report

=== Pool C ===
Pos	Team	Pld	W	L	Pts	SW	SL	SR	SPW	SPL	SPR	Qualification
1	Italy	2	2	0	4	6	4	1.500	213	194	1.098	Quarterfinals
2	Netherlands	2	1	1	4	5	3	1.667	177	171	1.035	Quarterfinals
3	Estonia	2	0	2	1	2	6	0.333	165	190	0.868	9th–12th Semifinals

Date	Time		Score		Set 1	Set 2	Set 3	Set 4	Set 5	Total	Report
11 Apr	15:00	Estonia	2–3	Italy	25–21	20–25	25–23	16–25	12–15	98–109	Report
12 Apr	15:00	Netherlands	3–0	Estonia	31–29	25–21	25–17			81–67	Report
13 Apr	15:00	Italy	3–2	Netherlands	19–25	25–20	20–25	25–14	15–12	104–96	Report

=== Pool D ===
Pos	Team	Pld	W	L	Pts	SW	SL	SR	SPW	SPL	SPR	Qualification
1	France	2	2	0	6	6	0	MAX	150	111	1.351	Quarterfinals
2	Russia	2	1	1	3	3	4	0.750	158	150	1.053	Quarterfinals
3	Austria	2	0	2	0	1	6	0.167	123	170	0.724	9th–12th Semifinals

Date	Time		Score		Set 1	Set 2	Set 3	Set 4	Set 5	Total	Report
11 Apr	17:30	France	3–0	Russia	25–18	25–23	25–22			75–63	Report
12 Apr	17:30	Austria	0–3	France	16–25	21–25	11–25			48–75	Report
13 Apr	17:30	Russia	3–1	Austria	20–25	25–17	25–17	25–16		95–75	Report

== Final round ==
=== 9th–12th place ===
Semifinals
14 Apr
Latvia	2
Turkey	3
14 Apr
Estonia	1
Austria	3

9th place
15 Apr
Turkey	3
Austria	0
12th place
15 Apr
Latvia	3
Estonia	2

==== 9th–12th semifinals ====
Date	Time		Score		Set 1	Set 2	Set 3	Set 4	Set 5	Total	Report
14 Apr	15:15	Latvia	2–3	Turkey	21–25	17–25	25–17	25–17	9–15	97–99	Report
14 Apr	17:50	Estonia	2–3	Austria	27–25	19–25	25–20	23–25	10–15	104–110	Report

==== 11th place match ====
Date	Time		Score		Set 1	Set 2	Set 3	Set 4	Set 5	Total	Report
15 Apr	15:15	Latvia	3–2	Estonia	25–22	25–16	21–25	21–25	15–12	107–100	Report

==== 9th place match ====
Date	Time		Score		Set 1	Set 2	Set 3	Set 4	Set 5	Total	Report
15 Apr	17:30	Turkey	3–0	Austria	25–23	25–21	25–16			75–60	Report

=== Quarterfinals ===
Date	Time		Score		Set 1	Set 2	Set 3	Set 4	Set 5	Total	Report
14 Apr	11:00	Belgium	3–0	Serbia	26–24	25–21	25–10			76–55	Report
14 Apr	15:45	Italy	1–3	Russia	23–25	23–25	27–25	26–28		99–103	Report
14 Apr	13:15	Germany	2–3	Poland	25–21	21–25	26–24	18–25	12–15	102–110	Report
14 Apr	19:00	France	3–0	Netherlands	25–19	25–18	25–23			75–60	Report

=== 5th–8th place ===
Semifinals
15 Apr
Germany	3
Italy	0
15 Apr
Serbia	2
Netherlands	3

5th place
16 Apr
Germany	3
Netherlands	2
7th place
16 Apr
Italy	1
Serbia	3

==== 5th–8th semifinals ====
Date	Time		Score		Set 1	Set 2	Set 3	Set 4	Set 5	Total	Report
15 Apr	11:00	Germany	3–0	Italy	25–20	26–24	25–23			76–67	Report
15 Apr	13:15	Serbia	2–3	Netherlands	25–19	19–25	25–17	21–25	16–18	106–104	Report

==== 7th place match ====
Date	Time		Score		Set 1	Set 2	Set 3	Set 4	Set 5	Total	Report
16 Apr	11:00	Italy	1–3	Serbia	21–25	25–21	16–25	23–25		85–96	Report

==== 5th place match ====
Date	Time		Score		Set 1	Set 2	Set 3	Set 4	Set 5	Total	Report
16 Apr	13:15	Germany	3–2	Netherlands	25–20	26–24	20–25	21–25	15–9	107–103	Report

=== Final ===
Semifinals
15 Apr
Poland	3
Russia	0
15 Apr
Belgium	0
France	3

Final
16 Apr
Poland	2
France	3
Third place
16 Apr
Belgium	3
Russia	2

==== Semifinals ====
Date	Time		Score		Set 1	Set 2	Set 3	Set 4	Set 5	Total	Report
15 Apr	15:15	Poland	3–0	Russia	25–23	25–19	25–23			75–65	Report
15 Apr	18:00	Belgium	0–3	France	19–25	25–27	18–25			62–77	Report

==== 3rd place match ====
Date	Time		Score		Set 1	Set 2	Set 3	Set 4	Set 5	Total	Report
16 Apr	15:45	Belgium	3–2	Russia	26–28	32–24	25–22	25–16	15–12	123–102	Report

==== Final ====
Date	Time		Score		Set 1	Set 2	Set 3	Set 4	Set 5	Total	Report
16 Apr	18:00	France	3–2	Poland	25–21	25–19	22–25	24–26	15–7	111–98	Report

== Final standing ==
Rank	Team
1st place, gold medalist(s)	France
2nd place, silver medalist(s)	Poland
3rd place, bronze medalist(s)	Belgium
4	Russia
5	Germany
6	Netherlands
7	Serbia
8	Italy
9	Turkey
10	Austria
11	Latvia
12	Estonia

Qualified for the 2007 Youth World Championship

2007 Youth European champions

France
1st title

12–man Roster
Frédéric Barais, Cédric Benoit, Raphaël Corre, Martin Jambon, Ivan Kartev, Youssef Krou, Nicolas Le Jeune, Kévin Le Roux, Cyril Marquois, Earvin N'Gapeth, Guillaume Quesque, Benjamin Toniutti
Head coach

== Individual awards ==
- Most valuable player
  - (France) Guillaume Quesque
- Best spiker
  - (Italy) Ludovico Dolfo
- Best blocker
  - (Russia) Dmitry Shcherbinin
- Best server
  - (Germany) Markus Steuerwald
- Best setter
  - (France) Benjamin Toniutti
- Best scorer
  - (Belgium) Bram Van Den Dries
- Best libero
  - (Netherlands) Dirk Sparidans
