= 1989 FIVB Volleyball Boys' U19 World Championship =

1989 Boys' U19 World Championship
Tournament details
- Host country: United Arab Emirates
- Dates: 30 December 1989–7 January 1990
- Teams: 12
- Venue: 1 (in 1 host city)

Final positions
- Champions: Brazil (1st title)

The 1989 FIVB Volleyball Boys' U19 World Championship was held in Dubai, United Arab Emirates for nine days, from 30 December 1989 to 7 January 1990. This was the first edition of the tournament.

== Competition formula ==
The 12 teams were divided into two pools of six teams each and played a round-robin tournament. The top two teams of each pool progressed to the semifinals.

== Pools composition ==
Pool A	Pool B
United Arab Emirates (Hosts)	Brazil
Argentina	Czechoslovakia
Bulgaria	Japan
France	South Korea
Iran	Soviet Union
Puerto Rico	Qatar

== Preliminary round ==
=== Pool A ===
Pos	Team	Pld	W	L	Pts	SW	SL	SR	SPW	SPL	SPR	Qualification
1	Bulgaria	5	5	0	10	15	3	5.000	249	183	1.361	Semifinals
2	Iran	5	3	2	8	11	7	1.571	240	204	1.176	Semifinals
3	Puerto Rico	5	3	2	8	10	10	1.000	245	254	0.965	
4	Argentina	5	2	3	7	10	10	1.000	253	222	1.140	
5	France	5	1	4	6	7	14	0.500	242	280	0.864	
6	United Arab Emirates	5	1	4	6	5	14	0.357	188	174	1.080	

Date	Time		Score		Set 1	Set 2	Set 3	Set 4	Set 5	Total	Report
30 Dec		Bulgaria	3–2	France	15–13	15–6	11–15	8–15	15–11	64–60	
30 Dec		Iran	3–1	Argentina	9–15	15–6	15–7	15–11		54–39	
30 Dec		Puerto Rico	3–2	United Arab Emirates	13–15	15–10	12–15	15–8	15–13	70–61	
31 Dec		Bulgaria	3–0	United Arab Emirates	15–8	15–7	15–			45–15	
31 Dec		Iran	3–0	France	15–9	15–8	15–11			45–28	
31 Dec		Argentina	3–1	Puerto Rico	15–0	15–17	15–8	15–11		60–36	
02 Jan		Puerto Rico	3–0	France	15–4	15–8	15–11			45–23	
02 Jan		Argentina	3–0	United Arab Emirates	15–5	15–11	15–5			45–21	
02 Jan		Bulgaria	3–0	Iran	16–14	15–11	15–6			46–31	
03 Jan		Iran	3–0	United Arab Emirates	15–7	15–12	15–9			45–28	
03 Jan		France	3–2	Argentina	15–13	9–15	8–15	15–11	15–9	62–63	
03 Jan		Bulgaria	3–0	Puerto Rico	15–12	15–8	15–11			45–31	
04 Jan		Puerto Rico	3–2	Iran	15–13	9–15	15–9	9–15	15–13	63–65	
04 Jan		United Arab Emirates	3–2	France	15–12	7–15	9–15	15–12	17–15	63–69	
04 Jan		Bulgaria	3–1	Argentina	4–15	15–11	15–11	15–9		49–46	

=== Pool B ===
Pos	Team	Pld	W	L	Pts	SW	SL	SR	SPW	SPL	SPR	Qualification
1	Brazil	5	4	1	9	14	4	3.500	0	0	—	Semifinals
2	Soviet Union	5	4	1	9	13	5	2.600	0	0	—	Semifinals
3	South Korea	5	4	1	9	14	6	2.333	0	0	—	
4	Japan	5	2	3	7	6	11	0.545	0	0	—	
5	Czechoslovakia	5	1	4	6	5	13	0.385	0	0	—	
6	Qatar	5	0	5	5	2	15	0.133	0	0	—	

Date	Time		Score		Set 1	Set 2	Set 3	Set 4	Set 5	Total	Report
30 Dec		Brazil	3–0	Japan	–	–	–			0–0	
30 Dec		Soviet Union	3–0	Qatar	–	–	–			0–0	
30 Dec		South Korea	3–0	Czechoslovakia	–	–	–			0–0	
31 Dec		Soviet Union	3–0	Czechoslovakia	–	–	–			0–0	
31 Dec		Japan	3–0	Qatar	–	–	–			0–0	
31 Dec		South Korea	3–2	Brazil	8–15	6–15	15–11	15–12	17–16	61–69	
02 Jan		Brazil	3–0	Czechoslovakia	15–4	15–9	15–4			45–17	
02 Jan		South Korea	3–1	Qatar	15–7	11–15	15–3	15–8		56–33	
02 Jan		Soviet Union	3–0	Japan	15–5	15–3	15–8			45–16	
03 Jan		Brazil	3–0	Qatar	15–4	15–1	15–4			45–9	
03 Jan		Soviet Union	3–2	South Korea	15–3	9–15	15–8	7–15	15–10	61–51	
03 Jan		Japan	3–2	Czechoslovakia	–	–	–	–	–	0–0	
04 Jan		Czechoslovakia	3–1	Japan	15–7	14–16	15–2	15–2		59–27	
04 Jan		Brazil	3–1	Soviet Union	15–11	5–15	15–10	15–5		50–41	
04 Jan		South Korea	3–0	Japan	15–9	15–6	15–9			45–24	

== Final round ==
=== 1st–4th places ===
Semifinals
06 January
Bulgaria	0
Soviet Union	3
06 January
Brazil	3
Iran	0

Final
07 January
Soviet Union	1
Brazil	3
3rd place match
07 January
Bulgaria	3
Iran	0

==== Semifinals ====
Date	Time		Score		Set 1	Set 2	Set 3	Set 4	Set 5	Total	Report
06 Jan		Bulgaria	0–3	Soviet Union	6–15	7–15	10–15			23–45	
06 Jan		Brazil	3–0	Iran	15–1	15–4	15–6			45–11	

==== 3rd place match ====
Date	Time		Score		Set 1	Set 2	Set 3	Set 4	Set 5	Total	Report
07 Jan		Bulgaria	3–0	Iran	15–1	15–11	15–2			45–14	

==== Final ====
Date	Time		Score		Set 1	Set 2	Set 3	Set 4	Set 5	Total	Report
07 Jan		Soviet Union	1–3	Brazil	9–15	8–15	15–12	10–15		42–57	

== Final standing ==
Rank	Team
1st place, gold medalist(s)	Brazil
2nd place, silver medalist(s)	Soviet Union
3rd place, bronze medalist(s)	Bulgaria
4	Iran
5	South Korea
5	Puerto Rico
7	Argentina
7	Japan
9	Czechoslovakia
9	France
11	Qatar
11	United Arab Emirates

1989 Boys' U19 World champions

Brazil
1st title

== See also ==
- 1989 FIVB Girls' U18 World Championship
