= 1999 FIVB Volleyball Boys' U19 World Championship =

1999 Boys' U19 World Championship
Tournament details
- Host country: Saudi Arabia
- City: Riyadh
- Teams: 16

Final positions
- Champions: Russia (1st title)

The 1999 FIVB Volleyball Boys' U19 World Championship was held in Riyadh, Saudi Arabia.

== Final standings ==
Final standings results are given below.

Rank	Team
1st place, gold medalist(s)	Russia
2nd place, silver medalist(s)	Venezuela
3rd place, bronze medalist(s)	Poland
4	Saudi Arabia
5	Ukraine
6	South Korea
7	Brazil
8	Czech Republic
9	Tunisia
9	Japan
9	China
9	France
13	Slovakia
13	Mexico
13	Algeria
13	Dominican Republic
