= Volleyball at the 2015 European Youth Summer Olympic Festival – Boys' tournament =

2015 European Youth Summer Olympic Festival

Tournament details
- Host country: Georgia
- Dates: 27 July – 1 August
- Venue: 1 (in 1 host city)

Final positions
- Champions: Poland (3rd title)

The boys' tournament in volleyball at the 2015 European Youth Summer Olympic Festival in Tbilisi, Georgia was the event in a European Youth Summer Olympic Festival. It was held at New Volleyball Arena from 27 July to 1 August 2015.

== Final round ==
Semifinals
31 July
Poland	3
Czech Republic	0
31 July
Italy	2
Bulgaria	3

Final
1 August
Poland	3
Bulgaria	0
3rd place
1 August
Czech Republic	1
Italy	3

=== Semifinals ===
Date	Time		Score		Set 1	Set 2	Set 3	Set 4	Set 5	Total	Report
31 Jul	16:30	Italy	2–3	Bulgaria	23–25	25–21	22–25	25–18	4–15	99–104	Report
31 Jul	19:00	Poland	3–0	Czech Republic	25–19	25–23	25–21			75–63	Report

=== Third Place ===
Date	Time		Score		Set 1	Set 2	Set 3	Set 4	Set 5	Total	Report
1 Aug	16:27	Czech Republic	1–3	Italy	25–20	24–26	16–25	17–25		82–96	Report

=== Final ===
Date	Time		Score		Set 1	Set 2	Set 3	Set 4	Set 5	Total	Report
1 Aug	18:39	Poland	3–0	Bulgaria	25–15	25–14	25–18			75–47	Report

== Final standings ==
Rank	Team
1st place, gold medalist(s)	Poland
2nd place, silver medalist(s)	Bulgaria
3rd place, bronze medalist(s)	Italy
4	Czech Republic
5	Serbia
6	Russia
7	Turkey
8	Georgia

2015 Boys' European Youth Summer Olympic Festival champions

Poland
3rd title

== Medalists ==
Gold	Silver	Bronze
(Poland) Poland Patryk Niemiec; Bartosz Kwolek; Jakub Kochanowski (captain); Łukasz Kozub; Jakub Szymański; Jakub Ziobrowski; Damian Domagała; Kamil Droszyński; Dawid Woch; Mateusz Masłowski; Tomasz Fornal; Tomasz Polczyk	Bulgaria Plamen Shekerdzhiev; Kiril Kotev; Dimitar Uzunov; Ivaylo Ivanov; Kristian Iliev; Stanislav Dramov; Stefan Ivanov; Aleks Grozdanov; Radoslav Parapunov (captain); Gordan Lyutskanov; Georgi Dimitrov; Nikolay Manchev	Italy Pietro Margutti; Alessandro Piccinelli; Edoardo Caneschi; Roberto Cominetti; Riccardo Sbertoli; Francesco Zoppellari; Paolo Zonca; Davide Cester; Gabriele Di Martino; Gianluca Galassi (captain); Matteo Maiocchi; Jacopo Fantini

== See also ==
- Volleyball at the 2015 European Youth Summer Olympic Festival – Girls' tournament
