= 2016–17 Asseco Resovia Rzeszów season =

Asseco Resovia Rzeszów
2016–17 season
- Chairman: Bartosz Górski
- Manager: Andrzej Kowal

Asseco Resovia Rzeszów 2016–2017 season is the 2016/2017 volleyball season for Polish professional volleyball club Asseco Resovia Rzeszów.

The club competes in:

- Polish Championship
- Polish Cup
- CEV Champions League

== Team Roster Season 2016-2017 ==
Head coach: Andrzej Kowal

No.	Name	Date of birth	Position
2	(United States) Thomas Jaeschke^{1}	September 4, 1993 (age 31)	outside hitter
4	(Poland) Piotr Nowakowski	December 18, 1987 (age 37)	middle blocker
5	(Czech Republic) Lukáš Ticháček	January 12, 1982 (age 43)	setter
6	(Poland) Dawid Dryja	July 21, 1992 (age 32)	middle blocker
7	(Poland) Bartłomiej Lemański	March 19, 1996 (age 29)	middle blocker
8	(Serbia) Marko Ivović	December 22, 1990 (age 34)	outside hitter
9	(Canada) John Perrin	August 17, 1989 (age 35)	outside hitter
10	(Germany) Jochen Schöps	October 8, 1983 (age 41)	opposite
11	(Poland) Fabian Drzyzga	January 3, 1990 (age 35)	setter
12	(Canada) Gavin Schmitt	January 27, 1986 (age 39)	opposite
14	(France) Thibault Rossard	August 28, 1993 (age 31)	outside hitter
16	(Poland) Mateusz Masłowski	June 13, 1997 (age 27)	libero
17	(Poland) Marcin Możdżonek	February 9, 1985 (age 40)	middle blocker
18	(Poland) Damian Wojtaszek	September 7, 1988 (age 36)	libero
20	(Canada) Frederic Winters	September 25, 1982 (age 42)	outside hitter

^{1} According to notation in contract, Jaeschke will back to Asseco Resovia team in January 2017, when he will graduate his university.

Players of Asseco Resovia Rzeszów on loan:

Name	Date of birth	Position	Current club
(Poland) Aleksander Śliwka	May 24, 1995 (age 29)	outside hitter	(Poland) Indykpol AZS Olsztyn
(Ukraine) Dmytro Pashytskyy	November 29, 1987 (age 37)	middle blocker	(Poland) Lotos Trefl Gdańsk

== Squad changes for the 2016–2017 season ==
In:

No.	Player	Position	From
3	(Poland) Dominik Depowski	outside hitter	AGH 100RK Kraków
7	(Poland) Bartłomiej Lemański	middle blocker	AZS Politechnika Warszawska
8	(Serbia) Marko Ivović	outside hitter	Belogorie Belgorod
9	(Canada) John Perrin	outside hitter	LPR Piacenza
12	(Canada) Gavin Schmitt	opposite	Funvic Taubaté
14	(France) Thibault Rossard	outside hitter	Arago de Sète
16	(Poland) Mateusz Masłowski	libero	SMS PZPS Spała
17	(Poland) Marcin Możdżonek	middle blocker	Cuprum Lubin
20	(Canada) Frederic Winters	outside hitter	Sada Cruzeiro

Out:

No.	Player	Position	To
1	(Poland) Bartosz Kurek	opposite	JT Thunders Hiroshima
3	(Poland) Dominik Witczak	opposite	ZAKSA Kędzierzyn-Koźle
3	(Poland) Dominik Depowski	outside hitter
7	(Belarus) (Poland) Olieg Achrem	outside hitter	Halkbank Ankara
8	(France) Julien Lyneel	outside hitter	CMC Romagna
9	(Ukraine) Dmytro Pashytskyy	middle blocker	Lotos Trefl Gdańsk (loan)
12	(Poland) Łukasz Perłowski	middle blocker	Espadon Szczecin
14	(Poland) Aleksander Śliwka	outside hitter	Indykpol AZS Olsztyn (loan)
16	(Poland) Krzysztof Ignaczak	libero	Ended up career.
17	(Bulgaria) Nikolay Penchev	outside hitter	PGE Skra Bełchatów
18	(United States) Russell Holmes	middle blocker

== Most Valuable Players ==
No.	Player	MVP
1.	Marko Ivović	5
2.	Gavin Schmitt	4
	Jochen Schops	4
4.	Thibault Rossard	3
	Fabian Drzyzga	3
6.	Bartłomiej Lemański	2
	John Gordon Perrin	2
8.	Mateusz Masłowski	1
	Marcin Możdżonek	1

== Results, schedules and standings ==
=== 2016–17 PlusLiga ===
==== Regular season ====
1 October 2016; 15:00	ONICO AZS Politechnika Warszawska	0–3	Asseco Resovia Rzeszów	Torwar Hall, Warsaw; Attendance: 2,800; Referees: Niemczura Waldemar / Król Piotr
1 October 2016; 15:00	(15–25, 22–25, 23–25) MVP: Thibault Rossard			Torwar Hall, Warsaw; Attendance: 2,800; Referees: Niemczura Waldemar / Król Piotr

6 October 2016; 18:00	Espadon Szczecin	0–3	Asseco Resovia Rzeszów	Azoty Arena, Szczecin; Attendance: 1,800; Referees: Maroszek Wojciech / Lagierski Marek
6 October 2016; 18:00	(21–25, 20–25, 22–25) MVP: Fabian Drzyzga			Azoty Arena, Szczecin; Attendance: 1,800; Referees: Maroszek Wojciech / Lagierski Marek

15 October 2016; 14:45	PGE Skra Bełchatów	1–3	Asseco Resovia Rzeszów	Energia Hall, Bełchatów; Attendance: 2,700; Referees: Król Piotr / Maroszek Wojciech
15 October 2016; 14:45	(23–25, 18–25, 25–19, 20–25) MVP: Fabian Drzyzga			Energia Hall, Bełchatów; Attendance: 2,700; Referees: Król Piotr / Maroszek Wojciech

21 October 2016; 20:15	Asseco Resovia Rzeszów	3–1	Lotos Trefl Gdańsk	Podpromie Hall, Rzeszów; Attendance: 4,380; Referees: Twardowski Maciej - Pindral Szymon
21 October 2016; 20:15	(25–18, 25–17, 17–25, 25–17) MVP: John Gordon Perrin			Podpromie Hall, Rzeszów; Attendance: 4,380; Referees: Twardowski Maciej - Pindral Szymon

26 October 2016; 18:00	Cuprum Lubin	3–0	Asseco Resovia Rzeszów	HWS RCS, Lubin; Attendance: 2,545; Referees: Ignatowicz Paweł - Gołąbek Sławomir
26 October 2016; 18:00	(25–20, 25–20, 25–22) MVP: Łukasz Kaczmarek			HWS RCS, Lubin; Attendance: 2,545; Referees: Ignatowicz Paweł - Gołąbek Sławomir

30 October 2016; 14:45	Asseco Resovia Rzeszów	3–0	Cerrad Czarni Radom	Podpromie Hall, Rzeszów; Attendance: 4,000; Referees: Gołąbek Sławomir - Kobienia Waldemar
30 October 2016; 14:45	(25–18, 25–16, 25–15) MVP: Marko Ivović			Podpromie Hall, Rzeszów; Attendance: 4,000; Referees: Gołąbek Sławomir - Kobienia Waldemar

4 November 2016; 20:15	Jastrzębski Węgiel	3–1	Asseco Resovia Rzeszów	Hala Sportowa, Jastrzębie-Zdrój; Attendance: 3,000; Referees: Maciejewski Maciej - Makowski Jarosław
4 November 2016; 20:15	(25–17, 25–21, 23–25, 25–20) MVP: Salvador Hidalgo Oliva			Hala Sportowa, Jastrzębie-Zdrój; Attendance: 3,000; Referees: Maciejewski Maciej - Makowski Jarosław

12 November 2016; 17:00	Asseco Resovia Rzeszów	2–3	GKS Katowice	Podpromie Hall, Rzeszów; Attendance: 4,050; Referees: Kolendowski Maciej - Flis Tomasz
12 November 2016; 17:00	(25–17, 23–25, 23–25, 25–22, 11–15) MVP: Karol Butryn			Podpromie Hall, Rzeszów; Attendance: 4,050; Referees: Kolendowski Maciej - Flis Tomasz

19 November 2016; 17:00	Łuczniczka Bydgoszcz	0–3	Asseco Resovia Rzeszów	Łuczniczka, Bydgoszcz; Attendance: 4,250; Referees: Lagierski Marek - Kuchna Andrzej
19 November 2016; 17:00	(21–25, 18–25, 20–25) MVP: Gavin Schmitt			Łuczniczka, Bydgoszcz; Attendance: 4,250; Referees: Lagierski Marek - Kuchna Andrzej

26 November 2016; 20:00	Asseco Resovia Rzeszów	3–1	Indykpol AZS Olsztyn	Podpromie Hall, Rzeszów; Attendance: 4,150; Referees: Niemczura Waldemar - Maroszek Wojciech
26 November 2016; 20:00	(25–19, 22–25, 25–22, 25–21) MVP: Gavin Schmitt			Podpromie Hall, Rzeszów; Attendance: 4,150; Referees: Niemczura Waldemar - Maroszek Wojciech

30 November 2016; 20:30	AZS Częstochowa	0–3	Asseco Resovia Rzeszów	Sports Hall "Częstochowa", Częstochowa; Attendance: 1,700; Referees: Flis Tomasz - Kolendowski Maciej
30 November 2016; 20:30	(23–25, 18–25, 21–25) MVP: Marko Ivovic			Sports Hall "Częstochowa", Częstochowa; Attendance: 1,700; Referees: Flis Tomasz - Kolendowski Maciej

3 December 2016; 17:00	Asseco Resovia Rzeszów	3–2	BBTS Bielsko-Biała	Podpromie Hall, Rzeszów; Attendance: 4,050; Referees: Ignatowicz Paweł - Sokół Katarzyna
3 December 2016; 17:00	(28–30, 25–16, 21–25, 25–18, 15–7) MVP: Gavin Schmitt			Podpromie Hall, Rzeszów; Attendance: 4,050; Referees: Ignatowicz Paweł - Sokół Katarzyna

10 December 2016; 17:00	Effector Kielce	0–3	Asseco Resovia Rzeszów	Legionów Hall, Kielce; Attendance: 2,000; Referees: Król Piotr - Kuchna Andrzej
10 December 2016; 17:00	(21–25, 29–31, 12–25) MVP: Thibault Rossard			Legionów Hall, Kielce; Attendance: 2,000; Referees: Król Piotr - Kuchna Andrzej

14 December 2016; 18:00	Asseco Resovia Rzeszów	3–0	MKS Będzin	Podpromie Hall, Rzeszów; Attendance: 3,320; Referees: Flis Tomasz - Kolendowski Maciej
14 December 2016; 18:00	(25–20, 25–17, 25–18) MVP: Bartłomiej Lemański			Podpromie Hall, Rzeszów; Attendance: 3,320; Referees: Flis Tomasz - Kolendowski Maciej

17 December 2016; 14:45	ZAKSA Kędzierzyn-Koźle	2–3	Asseco Resovia Rzeszów	Azoty Hall, Kędzierzyn-Koźle; Attendance: 3,000; Referees: Król Piotr - Burkiewicz Paweł
17 December 2016; 14:45	(23–25, 25–18, 25–18, 18–25, 13–15) MVP: Marko Ivović			Azoty Hall, Kędzierzyn-Koźle; Attendance: 3,000; Referees: Król Piotr - Burkiewicz Paweł

30 December 2016; 20:15	Asseco Resovia Rzeszów	3–0	ONICO AZS Politechnika Warszawska	Podpromie Hall, Rzeszów; Attendance: 4,180; Referees: Król Piotr - Budzik Marek
30 December 2016; 20:15	(25–19, 25–18, 25–17) MVP: Bartłomiej Lemański			Podpromie Hall, Rzeszów; Attendance: 4,180; Referees: Król Piotr - Budzik Marek

7 January 2017; 17:00	Asseco Resovia Rzeszów	3–0	Espadon Szczecin	Podpromie Hall, Rzeszów; Attendance: 3,500; Referees: Lagierski Marek - Burkiewicz Paweł
7 January 2017; 17:00	(25–23, 25–18, 25–17) MVP: Mateusz Masłowski			Podpromie Hall, Rzeszów; Attendance: 3,500; Referees: Lagierski Marek - Burkiewicz Paweł

28 January 2017; 14:45	Asseco Resovia Rzeszów	3–1	PGE Skra Bełchatów	Podpromie Hall, Rzeszów; Attendance: 4,304; Referees: Burkiewicz Paweł - Twardowski Maciej
28 January 2017; 14:45	(20–25, 25–22, 30–28, 25–17) MVP: Gavin Schmitt			Podpromie Hall, Rzeszów; Attendance: 4,304; Referees: Burkiewicz Paweł - Twardowski Maciej

22 January 2017; 14:45	Lotos Trefl Gdańsk	3–2	Asseco Resovia Rzeszów	Ergo Arena, Gdańsk; Attendance: 4,150; Referees: Makowski Jarosław - Maciejewski Maciej
22 January 2017; 14:45	(23–25, 26–24, 17–25, 25–20, 15–10) MVP: Damian Schulz			Ergo Arena, Gdańsk; Attendance: 4,150; Referees: Makowski Jarosław - Maciejewski Maciej

5 February 2017; 18:00	Asseco Resovia Rzeszów	3–2	Cuprum Lubin	Podpromie Hall, Rzeszów; Attendance: 4,070; Referees: Herbik Marcin - Niewiarowska Magdalena
5 February 2017; 18:00	(26–24, 25–16, 15–25, 21–25, 17–15) MVP: Marcin Możdżonek			Podpromie Hall, Rzeszów; Attendance: 4,070; Referees: Herbik Marcin - Niewiarowska Magdalena

10 February 2017; 18:00	Cerrad Czarni Radom	1–3	Asseco Resovia Rzeszów	Hala MOSiR, Radom; Attendance: 1,500; Referees: Maciejewski Maciej - Wolski Zbigniew
10 February 2017; 18:00	(25–19, 18–25, 21–25, 14–25) MVP: Thibault Rossard			Hala MOSiR, Radom; Attendance: 1,500; Referees: Maciejewski Maciej - Wolski Zbigniew

18 February 2017; 20:00	Asseco Resovia Rzeszów	1–3	Jastrzębski Węgiel	Podpromie Hall, Rzeszów; Attendance: 4,512; Referees: Janik Tomasz - Michlic Agnieszka
18 February 2017; 20:00	(21–25, 25–15, 24–26, 20–25) MVP: Lukas Kampa			Podpromie Hall, Rzeszów; Attendance: 4,512; Referees: Janik Tomasz - Michlic Agnieszka

22 February 2017; 20:30	GKS Katowice	2–3	Asseco Resovia Rzeszów	Szopienice Hall, Katowice; Attendance: 1,500; Referees: Gołąbek Sławomir - Kobienia Waldemar
22 February 2017; 20:30	(26–28, 25–20, 25–22, 23–25, 12–15) MVP: Jochen Schops			Szopienice Hall, Katowice; Attendance: 1,500; Referees: Gołąbek Sławomir - Kobienia Waldemar

25 February 2017; 20:00	Asseco Resovia Rzeszów	3–0	Łuczniczka Bydgoszcz	Podpromie Hall, Rzeszów; Attendance: 4,094; Referees: Litwin Jacek - Twardowski Maciej
25 February 2017; 20:00	(25–17, 25–21, 25–13) MVP: Jochen Schops			Podpromie Hall, Rzeszów; Attendance: 4,094; Referees: Litwin Jacek - Twardowski Maciej

4 March 2017; 14:45	Indykpol AZS Olsztyn	2–3	Asseco Resovia Rzeszów	Urania Hall, Olsztyn; Attendance: 2,350; Referees: Michlic Agnieszka - Wolski Zbigniew
4 March 2017; 14:45	(25–19, 25–23, 17–25, 21–25, 10–15) MVP: Fabian Drzyzga			Urania Hall, Olsztyn; Attendance: 2,350; Referees: Michlic Agnieszka - Wolski Zbigniew

8 March 2017; 18:00	Asseco Resovia Rzeszów	3–0	AZS Częstochowa	Podpromie Hall, Rzeszów; Attendance: 3,623; Referees: Ignatowicz Paweł - Gołąbek Sławomir
8 March 2017; 18:00	(25–21, 25–20, 25–15) MVP: Marko Ivović			Podpromie Hall, Rzeszów; Attendance: 3,623; Referees: Ignatowicz Paweł - Gołąbek Sławomir

11 March 2017; 15:00	BBTS Bielsko-Biała	0–3	Asseco Resovia Rzeszów	Dębowiec Sports Arena, Bielsko-Biała; Attendance: 1,500; Referees: Twardowski Maciej - Pindral Szymon
11 March 2017; 15:00	(16–25, 19–25, 19–25) MVP: John Gordon Perrin			Dębowiec Sports Arena, Bielsko-Biała; Attendance: 1,500; Referees: Twardowski Maciej - Pindral Szymon

18 March 2017; 17:00	Asseco Resovia Rzeszów	3–1	Effector Kielce	Podpromie Hall, Rzeszów; Attendance: 4,070; Referees: Lagierski Marek - Król Piotr
18 March 2017; 17:00	(25–17, 25–14, 20–25, 25–15) MVP: Jochen Schops			Podpromie Hall, Rzeszów; Attendance: 4,070; Referees: Lagierski Marek - Król Piotr

26 March 2017; 17:00	MKS Będzin	0–3	Asseco Resovia Rzeszów	Hala Widowiskowo Sportowa, Sosnowiec; Attendance: 1,400; Referees: Pindral Szymon - Gołąbek Sławomir
26 March 2017; 17:00	(17–25, 16–25, 18–25) MVP: Marko Ivović			Hala Widowiskowo Sportowa, Sosnowiec; Attendance: 1,400; Referees: Pindral Szymon - Gołąbek Sławomir

1 April 2017; 20:00	Asseco Resovia Rzeszów	3–0	ZAKSA Kędzierzyn-Koźle	Podpromie Hall, Rzeszów; Attendance: 4,300; Referees: Maroszek Wojciech - Lagierski Marek
1 April 2017; 20:00	(25–21, 25–22, 25–19) MVP: Jochen Schops			Podpromie Hall, Rzeszów; Attendance: 4,300; Referees: Maroszek Wojciech - Lagierski Marek

==== Semifinal ====
9 April 2017; 17:30	PGE Skra Bełchatów	3–0	Asseco Resovia Rzeszów	Atlas Arena, Łódź; Attendance: 6,587; Referees: Maroszek Wojciech - Lagierski Marek
9 April 2017; 17:30	(25–21, 25–15, 25–13) MVP: Bartosz Kurek			Atlas Arena, Łódź; Attendance: 6,587; Referees: Maroszek Wojciech - Lagierski Marek

12 April 2017; 20:30	Asseco Resovia Rzeszów	2–3	PGE Skra Bełchatów	Podpromie Hall, Rzeszów; Referees: Twardowski Maciej - Pindral Szymon
12 April 2017; 20:30	(25–21, 19–25, 25–21, 18–25, 8–15) MVP: Bartosz Kurek			Podpromie Hall, Rzeszów; Referees: Twardowski Maciej - Pindral Szymon

==== Final ====
18 April 2017; 18:00	Jastrzębski Węgiel	3–1	Asseco Resovia Rzeszów	Hala Sportowa, Jastrzębie-Zdrój; Attendance: 3,000; Referees: Maciejewski Maciej - Makowski Jarosław
18 April 2017; 18:00	(25–21, 34–32, 24–26, 25–21) MVP: Lukas Kampa			Hala Sportowa, Jastrzębie-Zdrój; Attendance: 3,000; Referees: Maciejewski Maciej - Makowski Jarosław

23 April 2017; 17:30	Asseco Resovia Rzeszów	2–3	Jastrzębski Węgiel	Podpromie Hall, Rzeszów; Attendance: 4,304; Referees: Janik Tomasz - Herbik Marcin
23 April 2017; 17:30	(26–24, 25–17, 21–25, 26–28, 9–15) MVP: Salvador Hidalgo Oliva			Podpromie Hall, Rzeszów; Attendance: 4,304; Referees: Janik Tomasz - Herbik Marcin

=== 2016–17 CEV Champions League ===
==== Pool B ====
8 December 2016; 18:00	Dukla Liberec (Czech Republic)	2–3	(Poland) Asseco Resovia Rzeszów	Home Credit Arena, Liberec; Attendance: 2,180; Referees: AKINCI Erdal - RYABTSOV Alexander
8 December 2016; 18:00	(14–25, 16–25, 25–21, 25–23, 15–17)			Home Credit Arena, Liberec; Attendance: 2,180; Referees: AKINCI Erdal - RYABTSOV Alexander

22 December 2016; 18:00	Asseco Resovia Rzeszów (Poland)	3–2	(Germany) Berlin Recycling Volleys	Podpromie Hall, Rzeszów; Attendance: 4,087; Referees: KOZLOVSKYY Viktor - JANKOVIC Mirko
22 December 2016; 18:00	(21–25, 25–15, 23–25, 25–22, 15–12)			Podpromie Hall, Rzeszów; Attendance: 4,087; Referees: KOZLOVSKYY Viktor - JANKOVIC Mirko

19 January 2017; 18:00	Asseco Resovia Rzeszów (Poland)	0–3	(Italy) Cucine Lube Civitanova	Podpromie Hall, Rzeszów; Attendance: 4,258; Referees: RODRIGUEZ JATIVA Susana Maria - OVUKA Sinisa
19 January 2017; 18:00	(22–25, 13–25, 14–25)			Podpromie Hall, Rzeszów; Attendance: 4,258; Referees: RODRIGUEZ JATIVA Susana Maria - OVUKA Sinisa

1 February 2017; 20:30	Cucine Lube Civitanova (Italy)	3–0	(Poland) Asseco Resovia Rzeszów	Eurosuole Forum, Civitanova Marche; Attendance: 2,715; Referees: OZBAR Nurper - PASHKEVICH Alexey
1 February 2017; 20:30	(25–21, 25–16, 25–16)			Eurosuole Forum, Civitanova Marche; Attendance: 2,715; Referees: OZBAR Nurper - PASHKEVICH Alexey

14 February 2017; 19:30	Berlin Recycling Volleys (Germany)	3–2	(Poland) Asseco Resovia Rzeszów	Max-Schmeling-Halle, Berlin; Attendance: 4,308; Referees: SODJA Harald - MAKSHANOV Evgeny
14 February 2017; 19:30	(25–20, 25–22, 21–25, 20–25, 15–13)			Max-Schmeling-Halle, Berlin; Attendance: 4,308; Referees: SODJA Harald - MAKSHANOV Evgeny

1 March 2017; 18:00	Asseco Resovia Rzeszów (Poland)	3–1	(Czech Republic) Dukla Liberec	Podpromie Hall, Rzeszów; Attendance: 3,752; Referees: MEZÖFFY Zsolt - GELDOF Helena
1 March 2017; 18:00	(20–25, 25–18, 25–19, 25–18)			Podpromie Hall, Rzeszów; Attendance: 3,752; Referees: MEZÖFFY Zsolt - GELDOF Helena

==== Playoff 12 ====
15 March 2017; 20:30	Asseco Resovia Rzeszów (Poland)	2–3	(Italy) Azimut Modena	Podpromie Hall, Rzeszów; Attendance: 4,123; Referees: IVANOV Ivaylo - BAKUNOVICH Yury
15 March 2017; 20:30	(25–23, 19–25, 27–25, 19–25, 12–15)			Podpromie Hall, Rzeszów; Attendance: 4,123; Referees: IVANOV Ivaylo - BAKUNOVICH Yury

23 March 2017; 20:30	Azimut Modena (Italy)	3–1	(Poland) Asseco Resovia Rzeszów	PalaPanini, Modena; Attendance: 3,771; Referees: GEROTHODOROS Epaminondas - STOICA Bogdan Laurentiu
23 March 2017; 20:30	(25–23, 20–25, 25–23, 25–23)			PalaPanini, Modena; Attendance: 3,771; Referees: GEROTHODOROS Epaminondas - STOICA Bogdan Laurentiu
