= Volleyball at the 2019 Summer Universiade =

2019 Universiade Volleyball: Italy venues

Volleyball at the XXX Summer Universiade
- Venue: various
- Dates: 5–13 July
- Teams: 16 (per gender)

The Volleyball at the 2019 Summer Universiade in Naples is being held between July 5 and July 13. 32 volleyball teams is participating in the tournament. The indoor volleyball competition is taking place at PalaCoscioni in Nocera Inferiore, Palazzetto dello Sport in Ariano Irpino, PalaSele in Eboli and PalaTedeschi in Benevento.

== Qualification ==
Following the FISU regulations, The maximum of 16 teams in volleyball events where the number of entries is larger than the authorised participation level will be selected by

- The entry and the payment of guarantee.
- Those 8 teams finishing top rankings of the previous edition will be automatically qualified.
- Those 4 teams finishing bottom rankings of the previous edition will be replaced by new applying teams.
- The host is automatically qualified
- The remaining teams will be selected by wild card system according to geographical, continental representation, FISU ranking and FIVB ranking.

=== Qualified teams ===
==== Men's competition ====
Means of qualification	Date	Venue	Vacancies	Qualified
Host country	—	—	1	Italy
Top eight of previous edition	21–28 August 2017	(Taiwan) Taipei	8	Iran; Russia; Japan; Ukraine; Brazil; Argentina; Czech Republic; Portugal
Continental Quotas	—	—	3	Canada; Chinese Taipei; Switzerland
First Wild Cards	—	—	3	Mexico; China; United States; ~~Germany~~; ~~Hungary~~
Invitation/Later Confirmation	—	—	5	Chile; France; Hong Kong; Poland; South Korea
Total			20	

==== Women's competition ====
Means of qualification	Date	Venue	Vacancies	Qualified
Host country	—	—	1	Italy
Top five of previous edition	21–28 August 2017	(Taiwan) Taipei	5	Russia; Japan; Ukraine; Chinese Taipei; Thailand; ~~Finland~~; ~~France~~
Continental Quotas	—	—	3	United States; China; Germany
Wild Cards	—	—	7	Argentina Brazil; Canada; Czech Republic; Hungary; Mexico; Switzerland
Total			16	

== Draw ==
The pool will be drawn in accordance with FISU regulations based on the following criteria:

- Previous Summer Universiade results
- Participation in previous Summer Universiades
- Continental representation
- FIVB rankings

=== Men's competition ===
Pot 1	Pot 2	Pot 3	Pot 4	Pot 5
Iran (1); Russia (2); Japan (3); Ukraine (4)	Brazil (5); Argentina (6); Czech Republic (7); Portugal (8)	France (9); Switzerland (10); Canada (11); Chinese Taipei (12)	South Korea (13); Mexico (14); Hong Kong (16); United States (17)	Chile (21); Italy; China; Poland

=== Women's competition ===
Pot 1	Pot 2	Pot 3	Pot 4
Russia (1); Japan (2); Ukraine (3); Chinese Taipei (4)	Thailand (6); Argentina (8); Brazil (9); United States (10)	Switzerland (11); Czech Republic (12); Mexico (15); China	Italy; Canada; Germany; Hungary

== Pools composition ==
=== Men's competition ===
Pool A	Pool B	Pool C	Pool D
Czech Republic	South Korea	Canada	Argentina
Chile	United States	Brazil	Mexico
Chinese Taipei	Russia	France	Switzerland
Ukraine	Portugal	Iran	Italy
Hong Kong	China	Poland	Japan

=== Women's competition ===
Pool A	Pool B	Pool C	Pool D
Canada	Brazil	Chinese Taipei	United States
Thailand	Germany	Czech Republic	Switzerland
Russia	Ukraine	Hungary	Japan
Mexico	China	Argentina	Italy

== Medal summary ==
=== Medal table ===
* Host nation (Italy)

Rank	Nation	Gold	Silver	Bronze	Total
1	Italy (ITA)*	1	1	0	2
2	Russia (RUS)	1	0	1	2
3	Poland (POL)	0	1	0	1
4	Japan (JPN)	0	0	1	1
Totals (4 entries)		2	2	2	6

=== Medal events ===
Event	Gold	Silver	Bronze
Men	Italy (ITA); Fabio Ricci (c); Giulio Pinali; Sebastiano Milan; Giacomo Raffaelli; Alberto Polo; Yuri Romanò; Paolo Zonca; Marco Pierotti; Nicola Salsi; Alessandro Piccinelli; Gianluca Galassi; Francesco Zoppellari	Poland (POL); Jan Nowakowski; Michał Kędzierski (c); Łukasz Kozub; Bartłomiej Lipiński; Bartłomiej Lemański; Jędrzej Gruszczyński; Patryk Niemiec; Bartosz Filipiak; Kamil Semeniuk; Mateusz Masłowski; Paweł Halaba; Damian Domagała	Russia (RUS); Pavel Pankov (c); Kirill Klets; Andrey Surmachevskiy; Aleksei Kononov; Kirill Ursov; Roman Pakshin; Denis Bogdan; Dmitry Yakovlev; Roman Poroshin; Maksim Belogortsev; Aleksandr Melnikov; Semen Krivitchenko
Women	Russia (RUS); Ekaterina Evdokimova; Kristina Kurnosova; Anna Lazareva; Elena Novik; Viktroriia Russu; Daria Ryseva; Kseniia Smirnova; Angelina Sperskaite; Anastasia Stalnaya; Maria Vorobyeva; Valeriya Zaytseva; Olga Zubareva	Italy (ITA); Beatrice Molinaro; Carlotta Cambi; Francesca Bosio; Francesca Napodano; Beatrice Berti; Anna Nicoletti; Francesca Villani; Chiara De Bortoli; Giulia Angelina; Elena Perinelli; Alexandra Botezat; Sylvia Nwakalor	Japan (JPN); Arisa Inoue; Ayaka Sugi; Yuka Sawada; Chinami Furuya; Riho Sadakane; Minami Takaso; Mayu Oikawa; Saki Tanaka; Tamaki Matsui; Mami Yokota; Mikoto Shima; Yuka Ikeya
