= Jędrzej Gruszczyński =

Polish volleyball player (born 1997)

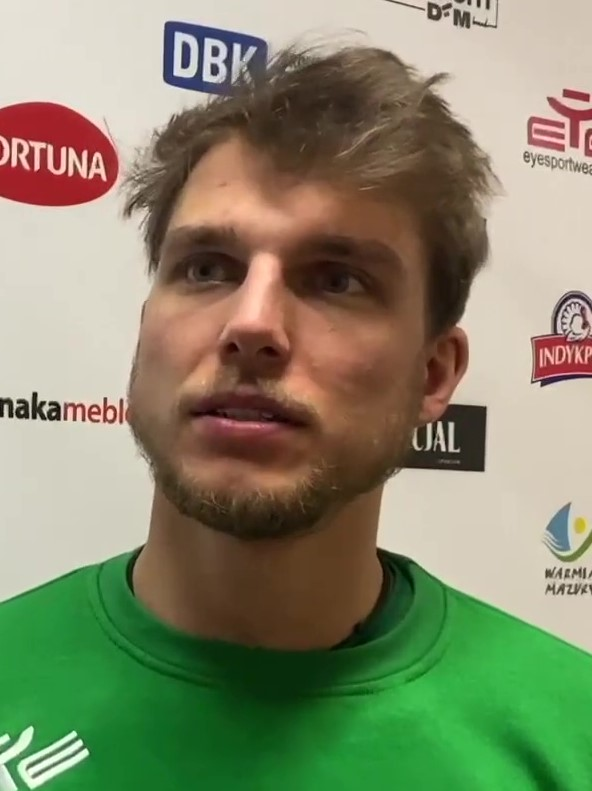
- Gruszczynski as AZS Olsztyn player

Personal information
- Born: 13 November 1997 (age 28); Września, Poland
- Height: 1.86 m (6 ft 1 in)
- Weight: 84 kg (185 lb)

Volleyball information
- Position: Libero
- Current club: ChKS Chełm
- Number: 8

Career
| Years | Teams |
|---|---|
| 2016–2018; 2018–2020; 2020–2022; 2022; 2022–2023; 2023–2025; 2025– | AZS Politechnika Warszawska; Cuprum Lubin; AZS Olsztyn; Warta Zawiercie; Skra Bełchatów; Projekt Warsaw; ChKS Chełm |
Honours
Men's volleyball
Representing Poland
FIVB Nations League
| Bronze medal – third place | 2019 Chicago |

Jędrzej Gruszczyński (born 13 November 1997) is a Polish professional volleyball player who plays as a libero for ChKS Chełm. He competed for Poland at the 2019 Nations League.

== Personal life ==
Gruszczyński's sister Jagoda is also a volleyball player. He graduated from SMS PZPS Spała in 2016.

== Career ==
=== National team ===
On 12 April 2015, the Poland national team, including Gruszczyński, won a title of the U19 European Champions. They beat Italy in the final (3–1). He took part in the 2015 European Youth Olympic Festival, and on 1 August 2015 achieved a gold medal after the final match with Bulgaria (3–0). On 23 August 2015, Poland achieved its first title of the U19 World Champions. In the final his team beat hosts – Argentina (3–2).

On 2 July 2017, Poland, including Gruszczyński, achieved a title of the U21 World Champions after beating Cuba in the final (3–0). His national team won 47 matches in the row and never lost.

== Honours ==
=== Club ===
- CEV Challenge Cup
  - 2023–24 – with Projekt Warsaw

=== Youth national team ===
- 2015 CEV U19 European Championship
- 2015 FIVB U19 World Championship
- 2017 FIVB U21 World Championship
