= Patryk Niemiec =

Polish volleyball player (born 1997)

Personal information
- Full name: Patryk Damian Niemiec
- Born: 18 February 1997 (age 29); Kędzierzyn-Koźle, Poland
- Height: 2.02 m (6 ft 8 in)
- Weight: 89 kg (196 lb)
- Spike: 353 cm (139 in)

Volleyball information
- Position: Middle blocker
- Current club: Trefl Gdańsk
- Number: 5

Career
Years	Teams
2016–2019; 2019–2020; 2020–2022; 2022–2024; 2024–2025; 2025–2026; 2026–	Trefl Gdańsk; Projekt Warsaw; Warta Zawiercie; Trefl Gdańsk; Asseco Resovia; Stilon Gorzów; Trefl Gdańsk

Patryk Damian Niemiec (born 18 February 1997) is a Polish professional volleyball player who plays as a middle blocker for Trefl Gdańsk.

== Career ==
=== National team ===
On 12 April 2015, the Poland national team, including Niemiec, won a title of the U19 European Champions. They beat Italy in the final (3–1). He took part in the 2015 European Youth Olympic Festival, and on 1 August 2015 achieved a gold medal after the final match with Bulgaria (3–0). On 23 August 2015, Poland achieved its first title of the U19 World Champions. In the final his team beat hosts – Argentina (3–2).

== Honours ==
=== Club ===
- CEV Cup
  - 2024–25 – with Asseco Resovia
- Domestic
  - 2017–18 Polish Cup, with Trefl Gdańsk

=== Youth national team ===
- 2015 CEV U19 European Championship
- 2015 European Youth Olympic Festival
- 2015 FIVB U19 World Championship

=== Universiade ===
- 2019 Summer Universiade
