= Jakub Ziobrowski =

Polish volleyball player (born 1997)

Personal information
- Nickname: Buben
- Nationality: Polish; American
- Born: 23 January 1997 (age 29) New York City, United States
- Height: 2.01 m (6 ft 7 in)
- Weight: 98 kg (216 lb)
- Spike: 353 cm (139 in)
- Block: 325 cm (128 in)

Volleyball information
- Position: Opposite
- Current club: Al Jazira SC

Career
- Years: Team
- 2016–2018 2018–2020 2020–2021 2021 2021–2022 2022 2022–2023 2023–: Czarni Radom; Cuprum Lubin; Projekt Warsaw; LUK Lublin; Ślepsk Suwałki; Cuprum Lubin; Alanya Belediyespor; Al Jazira SC

Jakub Ziobrowski (born 23 January 1997) is a Polish and American professional volleyball player who plays as an opposite spiker for Al Jazira SC.

== Career ==
=== Club ===
In May 2016, he signed a three–year contract with the first senior team in his career – Cerrad Czarni Radom.

=== National team ===
On April 12, 2015, Poland men's national under-19 volleyball team, including Ziobrowski, won title of U19 European Champion 2015. They beat Italy U19 in the final (3–1). He took part in European Youth Olympic Festival with Polish national U19 team. On August 1, 2015 he achieved gold medal (final match with Bulgaria 3–0). On August 23, 2015, Poland achieved first title of U19 World Champion. In the final his team beat hosts – Argentina (3–2). On September 10, 2016, he achieved title of the 2016 U20 European Champion after winning 7 of 7 matches in tournament and beating Ukraine U21 in the final (3–1). Also, Ziobrowski received individual award for the Best Opposite Spiker. On July 2, 2017, Poland U21, including Ziobrowski, achieved title of U21 World Champion 2017 after beating Cuba U21 in the final (3–0). His national team won 47 matches in the row and never lost. The U21 World Champion title ended his time in youth national teams.

== Honours ==
=== Youth national team ===
- 2015 CEV U19 European Championship
- 2015 European Youth Olympic Festival
- 2015 FIVB U19 World Championship
- 2016 CEV U20 European Championship
- 2017 FIVB U21 World Championship

=== Individual awards ===
- 2016: CEV U20 European Championship – Best opposite
