= Tomasz Fornal =

Polish volleyball player (born 1997)

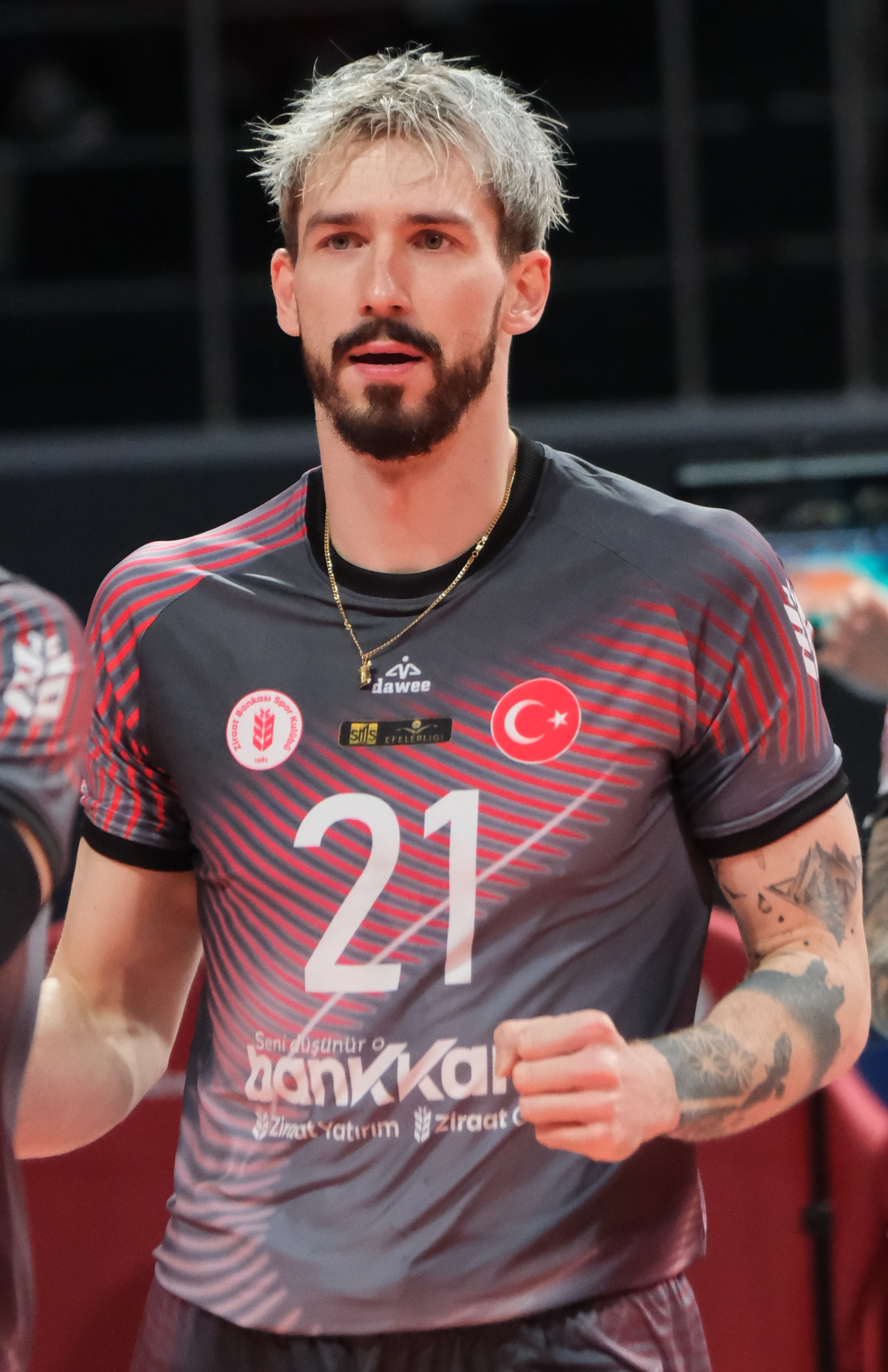
- Fornal in 2026

Personal information
- Born: 31 August 1997 (age 29) Kraków, Poland
- Height: 2.00 m (6 ft 7 in)
- Weight: 92 kg (203 lb)
- Spike: 348 cm (137 in)

Volleyball information
- Position: Outside hitter
- Current club: Warta Zawiercie
- Number: 21

Career
- Years: Team
- 2016–2019 2019–2025 2025–2026 2026–: Czarni Radom; Jastrzębski Węgiel; Ziraat Bankası Ankara; Warta Zawiercie

National team
- Years: Team
- 2018–: Poland
Honours
Men's volleyball
Representing Poland
Olympic Games
Silver medal – second place	2024 Paris	Team
FIVB World Championship
Silver medal – second place	2022 Poland/Slovenia
Bronze medal – third place	2025 Philippines
FIVB Nations League
Gold medal – first place	2023 Gdańsk
Gold medal – first place	2025 Ningbo
Gold medal – first place	2026 Ningbo
Silver medal – second place	2021 Rimini
Bronze medal – third place	2019 Chicago
Bronze medal – third place	2022 Bologna
Bronze medal – third place	2024 Łódź
CEV European Championship
Gold medal – first place	2023 Italy/Bulgaria/North Macedonia/Israel
Gold medal – first place	2026 Bulgaria/Finland/Italy/Romania
Bronze medal – third place	2021 Poland/Czechia/Estonia/Finland

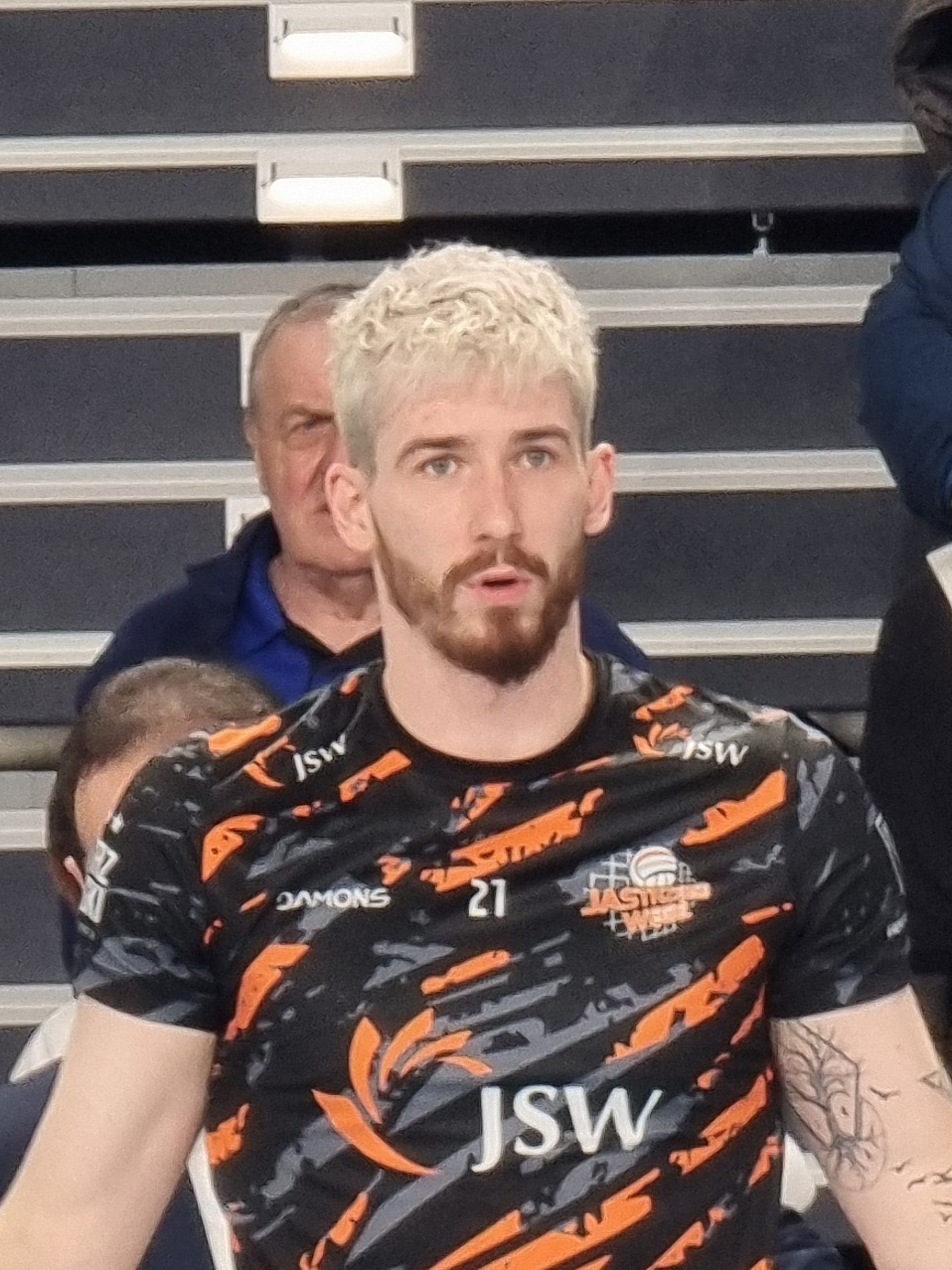
Fornal in 2024

Tomasz Fornal (Polish pronunciation: [ˈtɔmaʂ ˈfɔrnal]; born 31 August 1997) is a Polish professional volleyball player who plays as an outside hitter for Warta Zawiercie and the Poland national team. Fornal won silver medals at the 2024 Summer Olympics and the 2022 World Championship, as well as the 2021 Polish Champion title with Jastrzębski Węgiel.

== Career ==
=== Junior career ===
He started playing volleyball at the 22 UKS (Students' Sport Club) run by the Elementary School No. 155 in Kraków. He then represented Hutnik Dobry Wynik volleyball club while attending Junior High School No. 46 in Kraków. He subsequently entered the youth squad of PGE Skra Bełchatów and won bronze medal at the Polish Junior Championships with the team.

=== Senior career ===
In 2016, he made his debut in PlusLiga, Poland's highest level professional volleyball league, by joining Czarni Radom. In 2019, he changed the club and joined Jastrzębski Węgiel with which he won the 2020–21 PlusLiga title. and the 2022 Polish SuperCup. In 2023, he won silver medal with Jastrzębski Węgiel in the 2022–23 CEV Champions League, losing to ZAKSA Kędzierzyn-Koźle in the first ever all-Polish Champions League final. In 2025, he transferred to the Turkish club Ziraat Bankası S.K. where he played for one season winning the Efeler Ligi Turkish championship. In 2026, Fornal returned to the PlusLiga and became a player for Aluron CMC.

=== National team ===
On 12 April 2015, the Poland, including Fornal, won the U19 European Champions title. They beat Italy in the final (3–1). He took part in the 2015 European Youth Olympic Festival, and on 1 August 2015 won the tournament after beating Bulgaria in the final (3–0). On 23 August 2015, Poland won their first title of the U19 World Champions. In the final his team beat hosts – Argentina (3–2).

On 10 September 2016, he won the U20 European Champion title after winning 7 of 7 matches at the tournament, and beating Ukraine in the final (3–1). On 2 July 2017, Poland, including Fornal, won the U21 World Champions title after beating Cuba in the final (3–0). His national team won 47 matches in the row and never lost.

In 2022, he won a bronze medal with the national team at the 2022 Nations League held in Bologna, Italy. The same year, he won a silver medal at the 2022 World Championship jointly held in Poland and Slovenia, losing in the final to Italy (1–3).

In July 2023, he won a gold medal with his national team at the 2023 Nations League, defeating United States 3–1 in the final. In September 2023, he won a gold medal at the 2023 European Championship, defeating the reigning World Champions Italy in the final (3–0).

In August 2024, he won the silver medal at the 2024 Summer Olympic Games in Paris.

== Personal life ==
His father, Marek, is a former volleyball player, a two–time Polish Champion (1988, 1989) with Hutnik Nowa Huta while his mother, Dorota, is a PE teacher. He has an older brother, Jan.

In 2024, he was involved in the 32nd edition of the Great Orchestra of Christmas Charity. The winner of the charity auction was given an opportunity to go to Jastrzębie-Zdrój and take part in a training session with his team as well as go for a dinner with the player.

== Honours ==
=== Club ===
- CEV Champions League
  - 2022–23 – with Jastrzębski Węgiel
  - 2023–24 – with Jastrzębski Węgiel
- Domestic
  - 2020–21 Polish Championship, with Jastrzębski Węgiel
  - 2021–22 Polish SuperCup, with Jastrzębski Węgiel
  - 2022–23 Polish SuperCup, with Jastrzębski Węgiel
  - 2022–23 Polish Championship, with Jastrzębski Węgiel
  - 2023–24 Polish Championship, with Jastrzębski Węgiel
  - 2024–25 Polish Cup, with Jastrzębski Węgiel
  - 2025–26 Turkish SuperCup, with Ziraat Bankası Ankara
  - 2025–26 Turkish Cup, with Ziraat Bankası Ankara
  - 2025–26 Turkish Championship, with Ziraat Bankası Ankara

=== Youth national team ===
- 2014 CEV U20 European Championship
- 2015 CEV U19 European Championship
- 2015 European Youth Olympic Festival
- 2015 FIVB U19 World Championship
- 2016 CEV U20 European Championship
- 2017 FIVB U21 World Championship

=== Individual awards ===
- 2014: CEV U20 European Championship – Best receiver
- 2021: Polish SuperCup – Most valuable player
- 2023: PlusLiga – Player of the season
- 2024: FIVB Nations League – Best outside spiker
- 2025: Polish Cup – Most valuable player
- 2026: CEV Champions League – Best outside hitter
- 2026: FIVB Nations League – Most valuable player

=== State awards ===
- 2024: Knight's Cross of Polonia Restituta

== See also ==
- Sport in Poland
- List of Polish volleyball players
- List of people from Kraków
