= Volleyball at the 2015 European Youth Summer Olympic Festival =

- Venue: New Volleyball Arena
- Dates: 26 July–1 August 2015

The volleyball tournaments at the 2015 European Youth Summer Olympic Festival in Tbilisi played between 26 July and 1 August.

== Medalist events ==
Event	Gold	Silver	Bronze
Boys' indoor details	Poland Patryk Niemiec; Bartosz Kwolek; Jakub Kochanowski (captain); Łukasz Kozub; Jakub Szymański; Jakub Ziobrowski; Damian Domagała; Kamil Droszyński; Dawid Woch; Mateusz Masłowski; Tomasz Fornal; Tomasz Polczyk	Bulgaria Plamen Shekerdzhiev; Kiril Kotev; Dimitar Uzunov; Ivaylo Ivanov; Kristian Iliev; Stanislav Dramov; Stefan Ivanov; Aleks Grozdanov; Radoslav Parapunov (captain); Gordan Lyutskanov; Georgi Dimitrov; Nikolay Manchev	Italy Pietro Margutti; Alessandro Piccinelli; Edoardo Caneschi; Roberto Cominetti; Riccardo Sbertoli; Francesco Zoppellari; Paolo Zonca; Davide Cester; Gabriele Di Martino; Gianluca Galassi (captain); Matteo Maiocchi; Jacopo Fantini
Girls' indoor details	Turkey Melisa Memis; Tugba Senoglu; Gizem Asçi; Saliha Şahin; Buket Gülübay; Yasemin Güveli; Selmin Karahan (captain); Ezgi Akyaldiz; Ceren Domac; Tutku Yuzgenc; Zehra Güneş; Buse Melis Kara	Serbia Katarina Lazović (captain); Ana Martinović; Ana Jaksić; Tijana Milojević; Ljubica Milojević; Jovana Kocić; Anastasija Sekulić; Tamara Radmilović; Andela Veselinović; Milica Tasić; Vanja Bukilić; Anja Asonja	Italy Jennifer Boldini; Alessia Gardini; Beatrice Negretti; Benedetta Bartolini; Sasha Colombo; Giorgia Mazzon; Sylvia Nwakalor; Ilenia Moro; Marta Masiero (captain); Beatrice Tenti; Aurora Pistolesi; Alessia Mazzon
