= Tomasz Polczyk =

Polish volleyball player (born 1997)

Personal information
- Full name: Tomasz Polczyk
- Nationality: Polish
- Born: February 13, 1997 (age 29) Poland
- Height: 1.93 m (6 ft 4 in)
- Weight: 83 kg (183 lb)
- Spike: 339 cm (133 in)
- Block: 307 cm (121 in)

Volleyball information
- Position: Outside hitter
- Current club: ZAKSA Kędzierzyn-Koźle U23
- Number: 19

Career
- Years: Team
- 2013–2016 2016–: AZS Częstochowa U23; SMS PZPS Spała; ZAKSA Kędzierzyn-Koźle U23

National team
- Years: Team
- 2015: Poland U19
- Updated on 14 October 2017

Tomasz Polczyk (born 13 February 1997) is a Polish volleyball player, a member of Poland men's national volleyball team U19, U19 European Champion 2015.

== Career ==
=== National team ===
On April 12, 2015 Poland men's national volleyball team U19 team, including Polczyk, won title of U19 European Champion 2015. They beat in final Italy U19 (3–1). He took part in European Youth Olympic Festival with Polish national U19 team. On August 1, 2015 he achieved gold medal (final match with Bulgaria 3–0).

== Sporting achievements ==
=== National team ===
- 2015 CEV U19 European Championship
- 2015 European Youth Olympic Festival
