= Jakub Szymański (volleyball) =

Polish volleyball player (born 1998)

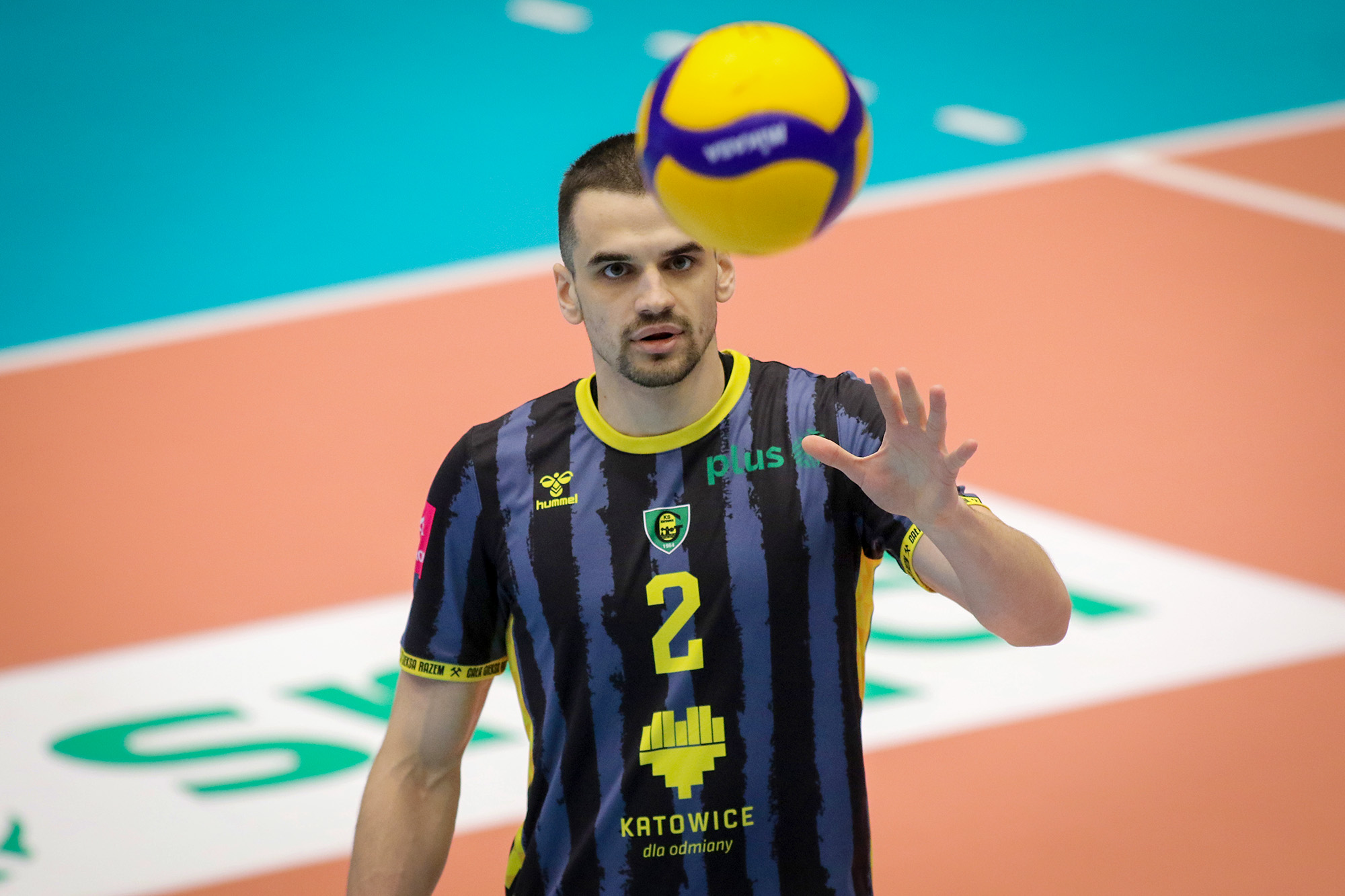

Personal information
- Born: 25 March 1998 (age 28); Waganiec, Poland
- Height: 2.00 m (6 ft 7 in)
- Weight: 82 kg (181 lb)
- Spike: 355 cm (140 in)

Volleyball information
- Position: Outside hitter
- Current club: GKS Katowice
- Number: 2

Career
Years	Teams
2017–2019; 2019–2023; 2023–2026; 2026–	Effector Kielce; GKS Katowice; ZAKSA Kędzierzyn-Koźle; GKS Katowice

Jakub Szymański (born 25 March 1998) is a Polish professional volleyball player who plays as an outside hitter for GKS Katowice.

== Career ==
=== National team ===
Szymański took part at the 2015 European Youth Olympic Festival and on 1 August 2015 achieved a gold medal after the final match with Bulgaria (3–0). On 23 August 2015, Poland achieved its first title of the U19 World Champions. In the final his team beat hosts – Argentina (3–2).

== Honours ==
=== Youth national team ===
- 2015 European Youth Olympic Festival
- 2015 FIVB U19 World Championship
