= Dawid Woch =

Polish volleyball player (born 1997)

Personal information
- Full name: Dawid Tomasz Woch
- Born: 16 May 1997 (age 29); Częstochowa, Poland
- Height: 2.00 m (6 ft 7 in)
- Weight: 86 kg (190 lb)
- Spike: 350 cm (138 in)

Volleyball information
- Position: Middle blocker
- Current club: Asseco Resovia
- Number: 2

Career
Years	Teams
2016–2017; 2017–2018; 2018–2019; 2019–2020; 2020–2021; 2021–2022; 2022–2023; 2023–2024; 2024–	MKS Będzin; Nice VB; GKS Katowice; BKS Visła Bydgoszcz; AZS Olsztyn; Gwardia Wrocław; BBTS Bielsko-Biała; Arcada Galați; Asseco Resovia

Dawid Tomasz Woch (born 16 May 1997) is a Polish professional volleyball player who plays as a middle blocker for Asseco Resovia.

== Career ==
On April 12, 2015 Poland men's national under-19 volleyball team, including Woch, won title of U19 European Champion 2015. They beat in final Italy U19 (3–1). He took part in European Youth Olympic Festival with Polish national U19 team. On August 1, 2015 he achieved gold medal (final match with Bulgaria 3–0). On 23 August 2015, Poland achieved its first title of U19 World Champion. In the final his team beat hosts – Argentina (3–2). On September 10, 2016 he achieved title of the 2016 CEV U20 European Champion after winning 7 of 7 matches in tournament and beating Ukraine U21 in the final (3–1).

He debuted in the 2016–17 PlusLiga season as a player of MKS Będzin. In November 2017, he signed a contract with Nice VB.

== Honours ==
=== Club ===
- CEV Cup
  - 2024–25 – with Asseco Resovia
- Domestic
  - 2023–24 Romanian SuperCup, with Arcada Galați

=== Youth national team ===
- 2015 CEV U19 European Championship
- 2015 European Youth Olympic Festival
- 2015 FIVB U19 World Championship
- 2016 CEV U20 European Championship

=== World University Games ===
- 2021 Summer World University Games
