= Damian Domagała =

Polish volleyball player (born 1998)

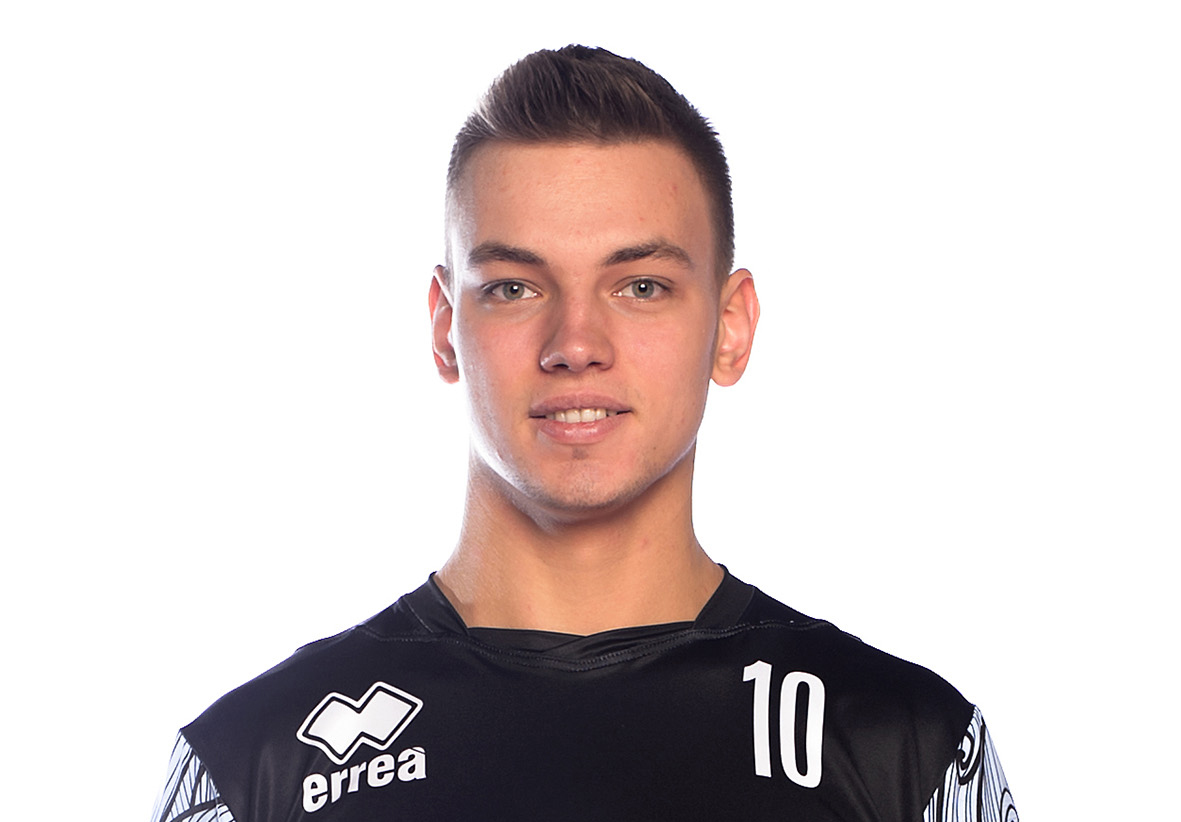

Personal information
- Born: 23 April 1998 (age 28); Łódź, Poland
- Height: 1.99 m (6 ft 6 in)
- Weight: 82 kg (181 lb)
- Spike: 346 cm (136 in)

Volleyball information
- Position: Opposite
- Current club: GKS Katowice
- Number: 10

Career
Years	Teams
2017–2019; 2019–2020; 2020–2021; 2021–	Volley Callipo; Cuprum Lubin; Asseco Resovia; GKS Katowice

Damian Domagała (born 23 April 1998) is a Polish professional volleyball player who plays as an opposite spiker for GKS Katowice.

== Career ==
=== Club ===
In July 2017, he signed a contract with Lechia Tomaszów Mazowiecki. A few days later, Italian club Tonno Callipo Calabria Vibo Valentia made a request to acquire Domagała, and as an agreement was reached, he made his debut in Serie A in the 2017–18 season.

=== National team ===
On 12 April 2015, the Polish national team, including Domagała, won a title of the U19 European Champions. They beat Italy in the final (3–1). He took part in the 2015 European Youth Olympic Festival, and on 1 August 2015 achieved a gold medal after the final match with Bulgaria (3–0). On 23 August 2015, Poland achieved its first title of the U19 World Champions. In the final his team beat hosts – Argentina (3–2).

On 10 September 2016, he achieved a title of the U20 European Champion after winning 7 out of 7 matches at the tournament, and beating Ukraine in the final (3–1). On 2 July 2017, Poland, including Domagała, achieved a title of the U21 World Champions after beating Cuba in the final (3–0). His national team won 47 matches in the row and never lost.

== Honours ==
=== Youth national team ===
- 2015 CEV U19 European Championship
- 2015 European Youth Olympic Festival
- 2015 FIVB U19 World Championship
- 2016 CEV U20 European Championship
- 2017 FIVB U21 World Championship

=== Universiade ===
- 2019 Summer Universiade
