= Kamil Droszyński =

Polish volleyball player (born 1997)

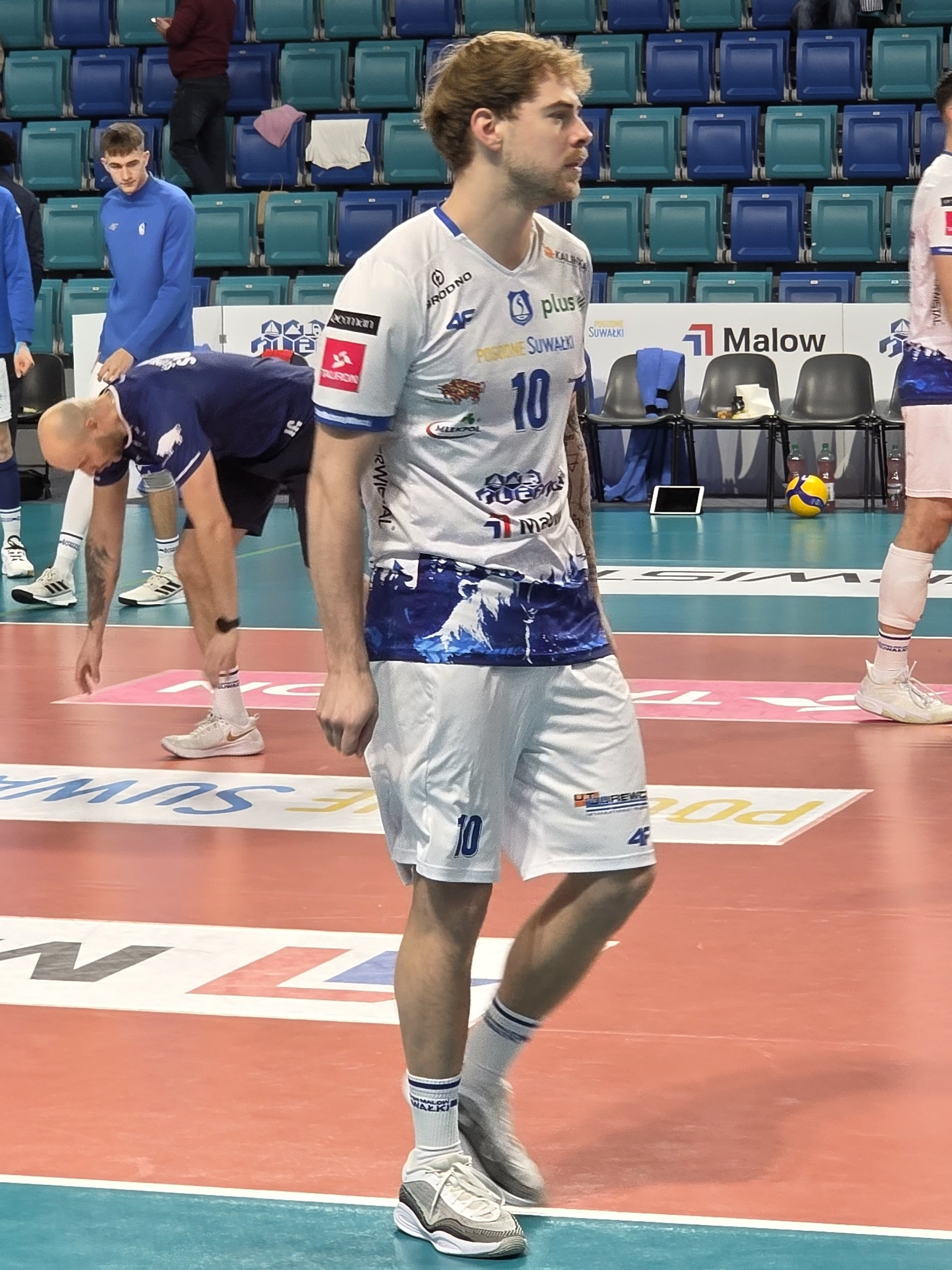
- Kamil Droszyński in 2025

Personal information
- Born: 28 January 1997 (age 29); Ciechocinek, Poland
- Height: 1.90 m (6 ft 3 in)
- Weight: 86 kg (190 lb)
- Spike: 337 cm (133 in)

Volleyball information
- Position: Setter
- Current club: Ślepsk Suwałki

Career
Years	Teams
2013–2016; 2016–2017; 2017–2018; 2018–2020; 2020–2021; 2021; 2021–2022; 2022–2025; 2025–	Transfer Bydgoszcz; Lindemans Aalst; Czarni Radom; Skra Bełchatów; AZS Olsztyn; Netzhoppers KW; Lindemans Aalst; Trefl Gdańsk; Ślepsk Suwałki

Kamil Droszyński (born 28 January 1997) is a Polish professional volleyball player who plays as a setter for Ślepsk Malow Suwałki.

== Career ==
=== National team ===
On April 12, 2015 Poland men's national under-19 volleyball team, including Droszyński, won title of U19 European Champion 2015. They beat Italy U19 in the final (3–1). He was named the Best Setter of the tournament. He took part in European Youth Olympic Festival with Polish national U19 team. On August 1, 2015 he achieved gold medal (final match with Bulgaria 3–0). On August 23, 2015 Poland achieved first title of U19 World Champion. In the final his team beat hosts – Argentina (3–2).

== Honours ==
=== Club ===
- Domestic
  - 2017–18 Polish SuperCup, with PGE Skra Bełchatów

=== Youth national team ===
- 2014 CEV U20 European Championship
- 2015 CEV U19 European Championship
- 2015 European Youth Olympic Festival
- 2015 FIVB U19 World Championship

=== Individual awards ===
- 2015: CEV U19 European Championship – Best setter
- 2015: FIVB U19 World Championship – Best setter
