= 2015 Boys' Youth European Volleyball Championship Qualification =

The qualification for the 2015 Boys' Youth European Volleyball Championship will be held from January 8–11, 2015. 31 teams are split into eight groups of 3 or 4 teams. The group winners and the three best second placed teams will qualify for the 2015 Boys' Youth European Volleyball Championship in Ankara, Turkey.

== Competing nations ==
Pool A	Pool B	Pool C	Pool D	Pool E	Pool F	Pool G	Pool H
Georgia; Hungary; Netherlands; Russia	Austria; Estonia; France; Montenegro	Czech Republic; Serbia; Sweden; Ukraine	Belarus; Poland; Slovakia	Belgium; Israel; Germany; Norway	Bulgaria; Denmark; Portugal; Slovenia	Croatia; Italy; Lithuania; Spain	Finland; Greece; Latvia; Romania

=== Pool A ===
The mini-tournament will be hosted in Russia.

Pos	Team	Pld	W	L	Pts	SW	SL	SR	SPW	SPL	SPR	Qualification
1	Russia	3	3	0	9	9	0	MAX	226	144	1.569	2015 Boys' Youth European Volleyball Championship
2	Netherlands	3	2	1	5	6	6	1.000	249	244	1.020	
3	Hungary	3	1	2	4	5	6	0.833	222	228	0.974	
4	Georgia	3	0	3	0	1	9	0.111	166	247	0.672	

Date	Time		Score		Set 1	Set 2	Set 3	Set 4	Set 5	Total	Report
8 Jan	16:00	Hungary	2–3	Netherlands	25–15	19–25	21–25	25–17	9–15	99–97	Report
8 Jan	18:00	Russia	3–0	Georgia	25–10	25–15	25–16			75–41	Report
9 Jan	16:00	Netherlands	3–1	Georgia	21–25	25–16	25–13	25–15		96–69	Report
9 Jan	18:30	Hungary	0–3	Russia	15–25	17–25	15–25			47–75	Report
10 Jan	16:00	Georgia	0–3	Hungary	24–26	16–25	16–25			56–76	Report
10 Jan	18:30	Netherlands	0–3	Russia	19–25	24–26	13–25			56–76	Report

=== Pool B ===
The mini-tournament will be hosted in France.

Pos	Team	Pld	W	L	Pts	SW	SL	SR	SPW	SPL	SPR	Qualification
1	France	3	3	0	9	9	0	MAX	225	141	1.596	2015 Boys' Youth European Volleyball Championship
2	Estonia	3	2	1	6	6	4	1.500	224	215	1.042	
3	Austria	3	1	2	3	4	7	0.571	238	255	0.933	
4	Montenegro	3	0	3	0	1	9	0.111	174	250	0.696	

Date	Time		Score		Set 1	Set 2	Set 3	Set 4	Set 5	Total	Report
9 Jan	16:30	Montenegro	1–3	Austria	25–27	25–27	25–21	9–25		84–100	Report
9 Jan	19:00	France	3–0	Estonia	25–17	25–15	25–19			75–51	Report
10 Jan	16:30	Austria	1–3	Estonia	22–25	25–21	22–25	19–25		88–96	Report
10 Jan	19:00	Montenegro	0–3	France	14–25	13–25	11–25			38–75	Report
11 Jan	15:00	Estonia	3–0	Montenegro	25–16	25–20	25–16			75–52	Report
11 Jan	17:30	Austria	0–3	France	19–25	20–25	11–25			50–75	Report

=== Pool C ===
The mini-tournament will be hosted in Serbia.

Pos	Team	Pld	W	L	Pts	SW	SL	SR	SPW	SPL	SPR	Qualification
1	Czech Republic	3	3	0	8	9	2	4.500	253	215	1.177	2015 Boys' Youth European Volleyball Championship
2	Serbia	3	2	1	7	8	5	1.600	293	264	1.110	2015 Boys' Youth European Volleyball Championship
3	Ukraine	3	1	2	3	4	6	0.667	211	226	0.934	
4	Sweden	3	0	3	0	1	9	0.111	196	248	0.790	

Date	Time		Score		Set 1	Set 2	Set 3	Set 4	Set 5	Total	Report
8 Jan	20:00	Ukraine	0–3	Czech Republic	23–25	16–25	21–25			60–75	Report
9 Jan	20:00	Serbia	3–1	Sweden	23–25	25–18	25–19	25–23		98–85	Report
10 Jan	17:30	Czech Republic	3–0	Sweden	25–18	25–19	25–19			75–56	Report
10 Jan	20:00	Ukraine	1–3	Serbia	25–21	16–25	19–25	16–25		76–96	Report
11 Jan	15:00	Sweden	0–3	Ukraine	19–25	15–25	21–25			55–75	Report
11 Jan	17:00	Czech Republic	3–2	Serbia	19–25	25–18	25–17	18–25	16–14	103–99	Report

=== Pool D ===
The mini-tournament will be hosted in Slovakia.

Pos	Team	Pld	W	L	Pts	SW	SL	SR	SPW	SPL	SPR	Qualification
1	Poland	2	2	0	6	6	0	MAX	150	104	1.442	2015 Boys' Youth European Volleyball Championship
2	Belarus	2	1	1	3	3	4	0.750	153	144	1.063	
3	Slovakia	2	0	2	0	1	6	0.167	137	172	0.797	

Date	Time		Score		Set 1	Set 2	Set 3	Set 4	Set 5	Total	Report
9 Jan	20:00	Slovakia	1–3	Belarus	24–26	25–20	16–25	24–26		89–97	Report
10 Jan	20:00	Belarus	0–3	Poland	19–25	23–25	14–25			56–75	Report
11 Jan	20:00	Poland	3–0	Slovakia	25–19	25–17	25–12			75–48	Report

=== Pool E ===
The mini-tournament will be hosted in Germany.

Pos	Team	Pld	W	L	Pts	SW	SL	SR	SPW	SPL	SPR	Qualification
1	Germany	3	3	0	9	9	0	MAX	227	174	1.305	2015 Boys' Youth European Volleyball Championship
2	Belgium	3	2	1	6	6	3	2.000	210	164	1.280	
3	Norway	3	1	2	2	3	8	0.375	219	249	0.880	
4	Israel	3	0	3	1	2	9	0.222	192	261	0.736	

Date	Time		Score		Set 1	Set 2	Set 3	Set 4	Set 5	Total	Report
8 Jan	17:30	Germany	3–0	Israel	25–19	25–15	25–17			75–51	Report
9 Jan	15:00	Belgium	3–0	Israel	25–20	25–9	25–13			75–42	Report
9 Jan	20:00	Norway	0–3	Germany	23–25	23–25	17–25			63–75	Report
10 Jan	17:30	Belgium	3–0	Norway	25–14	25–16	25–15			75–45	Report
11 Jan	14:00	Israel	2–3	Norway	26–24	18–25	25–22	21–25	9–15	99–111	Report
11 Jan	19:00	Germany	3–0	Belgium	27–25	25–15	25–20			77–60	Report

=== Pool F ===
The mini-tournament will be hosted in Bulgaria.

Pos	Team	Pld	W	L	Pts	SW	SL	SR	SPW	SPL	SPR	Qualification
1	Bulgaria	3	3	0	9	9	1	9.000	248	199	1.246	2015 Boys' Youth European Volleyball Championship
2	Denmark	3	2	1	6	7	3	2.333	230	214	1.075	2015 Boys' Youth European Volleyball Championship
3	Portugal	3	1	2	3	3	7	0.429	210	219	0.959	
4	Slovenia	3	0	3	0	1	9	0.111	218	252	0.865	

Date	Time		Score		Set 1	Set 2	Set 3	Set 4	Set 5	Total	Report
9 Jan	16:00	Slovenia	1–3	Portugal	21–25	25–22	24–26	23–25		93–98	Report
9 Jan	18:30	Bulgaria	3–1	Denmark	23–25	25–23	25–11	25–17		98–76	Report
10 Jan	16:00	Portugal	0–3	Denmark	23–25	20–25	10–25			53–75	Report
10 Jan	18:30	Slovenia	0–3	Bulgaria	20–25	23–25	21–25			64–75	Report
11 Jan	15:00	Denmark	3–0	Slovenia	25–19	25–17	29–27			79–63	Report
11 Jan	17:30	Portugal	0–3	Bulgaria	21–25	16–25	22–25			59–75	Report

=== Pool G ===
The mini-tournament will be hosted in Croatia.

Pos	Team	Pld	W	L	Pts	SW	SL	SR	SPW	SPL	SPR	Qualification
1	Italy	3	3	0	9	9	1	9.000	245	187	1.310	2015 Boys' Youth European Volleyball Championship
2	Spain	3	2	1	6	7	4	1.750	247	210	1.176	2015 Boys' Youth European Volleyball Championship
3	Croatia	3	1	2	3	4	7	0.571	203	256	0.793	
4	Lithuania	3	0	3	0	1	9	0.111	195	244	0.799	

Date	Time		Score		Set 1	Set 2	Set 3	Set 4	Set 5	Total	Report
9 Jan	15:00	Spain	1–3	Italy	21–25	20–25	25–17	16–25		82–92	Report
9 Jan	17:30	Croatia	3–1	Lithuania	16–25	25–18	25–20	25–21		91–84	Report
10 Jan	15:00	Italy	3–0	Lithuania	25–14	25–20	28–26			78–60	Report
10 Jan	17:30	Spain	3–1	Croatia	25–16	25–13	22–25	25–13		97–67	Report
11 Jan	15:00	Lithuania	0–3	Spain	22–25	12–25	17–25			51–75	Report
11 Jan	17:30	Italy	3–0	Croatia	25–20	25–11	25–14			75–45	Report

=== Pool H ===
The mini-tournament will be hosted in Greece.

Pos	Team	Pld	W	L	Pts	SW	SL	SR	SPW	SPL	SPR	Qualification
1	Romania	3	3	0	9	9	2	4.500	273	239	1.142	2015 Boys' Youth European Volleyball Championship
2	Finland	3	2	1	4	6	7	0.857	293	270	1.085	
3	Latvia	3	1	2	4	6	7	0.857	278	303	0.917	
4	Greece	3	0	3	1	4	9	0.444	272	304	0.895	

Date	Time		Score		Set 1	Set 2	Set 3	Set 4	Set 5	Total	Report
8 Jan	17:00	Romania	3–0	Finland	25–19	26–24	31–29			82–72	Report
8 Jan	19:30	Greece	1–3	Latvia	25–20	27–29	22–25	22–25		96–99	Report
9 Jan	17:00	Finland	3–2	Latvia	24–26	25–16	25–19	22–25	15–9	111–95	Report
9 Jan	19:30	Romania	3–1	Greece	25–20	18–25	25–13	27–25		95–83	Report
10 Jan	17:00	Latvia	1–3	Romania	25–21	17–25	22–25	20–25		84–96	Report
10 Jan	19:30	Finland	3–2	Greece	25–10	21–25	24–26	25–20	15–12	110–93	Report
