= Łukasz Kozub =

Polish volleyball player (born 1997)

Personal information
- Born: 3 November 1997 (age 28) Rzeszów, Poland
- Height: 1.86 m (6 ft 1 in)
- Weight: 88 kg (194 lb)
- Spike: 320 cm (126 in)

Volleyball information
- Position: Setter
- Current club: AZS Olsztyn
- Number: 4

Career
- Years: Team
- 2016–2018 2018–2019 2019–2022 2022–2023 2023 2023–2025 2025–: MKS Będzin; Asseco Resovia; Trefl Gdańsk; Stade Poitevin Poitiers; GKS Katowice; Asseco Resovia; AZS Olsztyn

National team
- Years: Team
- 2022–: Poland

Łukasz Kozub (born 3 November 1997) is a Polish professional volleyball player who plays as a setter for Indykpol AZS Olsztyn.

He played for Poland in the 2022 Nations League.

== Career ==
=== National team ===
On 12 April 2015, the Polish national team, including Kozub, won a title of the U19 European Champions. They beat Italy in the final (3–1). He took part in the 2015 European Youth Olympic Festival, and on 1 August 2015 achieved a gold medal after the final match with Bulgaria (3–0). On 23 August 2015, Poland achieved its first title of the U19 World Champions. In the final his team beat hosts – Argentina (3–2).

On 10 September 2016, he achieved a title of the U20 European Champion after winning 7 out of 7 matches at the tournament, and beating Ukraine in the final (3–1). On 2 July 2017, Poland, including Kozub, achieved a title of the U21 World Champions after beating Cuba in the final (3–0). Kozub was awarded an individual award for the Best Setter of the whole tournament. His national team won 47 matches in a row and never lost.

== Honours ==
=== Club ===
- CEV Cup
  - 2024–25 – with Asseco Resovia

=== Youth national team ===
- 2015 CEV U19 European Championship
- 2015 European Youth Olympic Festival
- 2015 FIVB U19 World Championship
- 2016 CEV U20 European Championship
- 2017 FIVB U21 World Championship

=== World University Games ===
- 2019 Summer Universiade
- 2021 Summer World University Games

=== Individual awards ===
- 2017: FIVB U21 World Championship – Best setter
