= Fabian Drzyzga =

Polish volleyball player (born 1990)

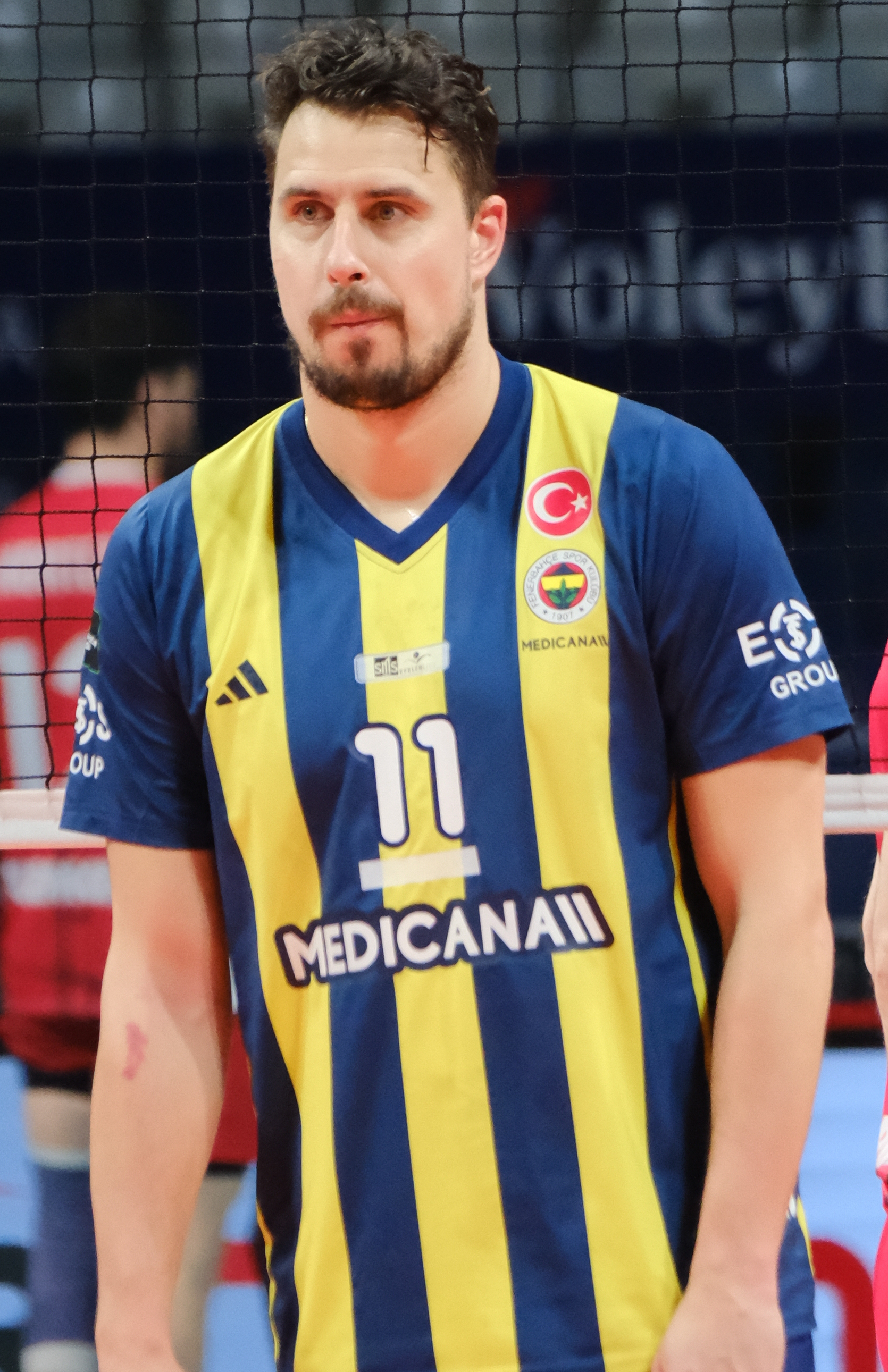

Personal information
- Nationality: Polish
- Born: 3 January 1990 (age 36); Bordeaux, France
- Height: 1.97 m (6 ft 6 in)
- Weight: 90 kg (198 lb)
- Spike: 340 cm (134 in)
- Block: 325 cm (128 in)

Volleyball information
- Position: Setter
- Current club: Stilon Gorzów
- Number: 11

Career
Years	Teams
2008–2012; 2012–2013; 2013–2017; 2017–2018; 2018–2020; 2020–2024; 2024–2026; 2026–	AZS Częstochowa; AZS Politechnika Warszawska; Asseco Resovia; Olympiacos; Lokomotiv Novosibirsk; Asseco Resovia; Fenerbahçe; Stilon Gorzów

National team
2010–	Poland
Honours
Men's volleyball
Representing Poland
FIVB World Championship
Gold medal – first place	2014 Poland
Gold medal – first place	2018 Bulgaria/Italy
FIVB World Cup
Silver medal – second place	2019 Japan
Bronze medal – third place	2015 Japan
FIVB Nations League
Silver medal – second place	2021 Rimini
CEV European Championship
Bronze medal – third place	2011 Austria/Czech Republic
Bronze medal – third place	2019 Belgium/France/Netherlands/Slovenia
Bronze medal – third place	2021 Poland/Czechia/Estonia/Finland

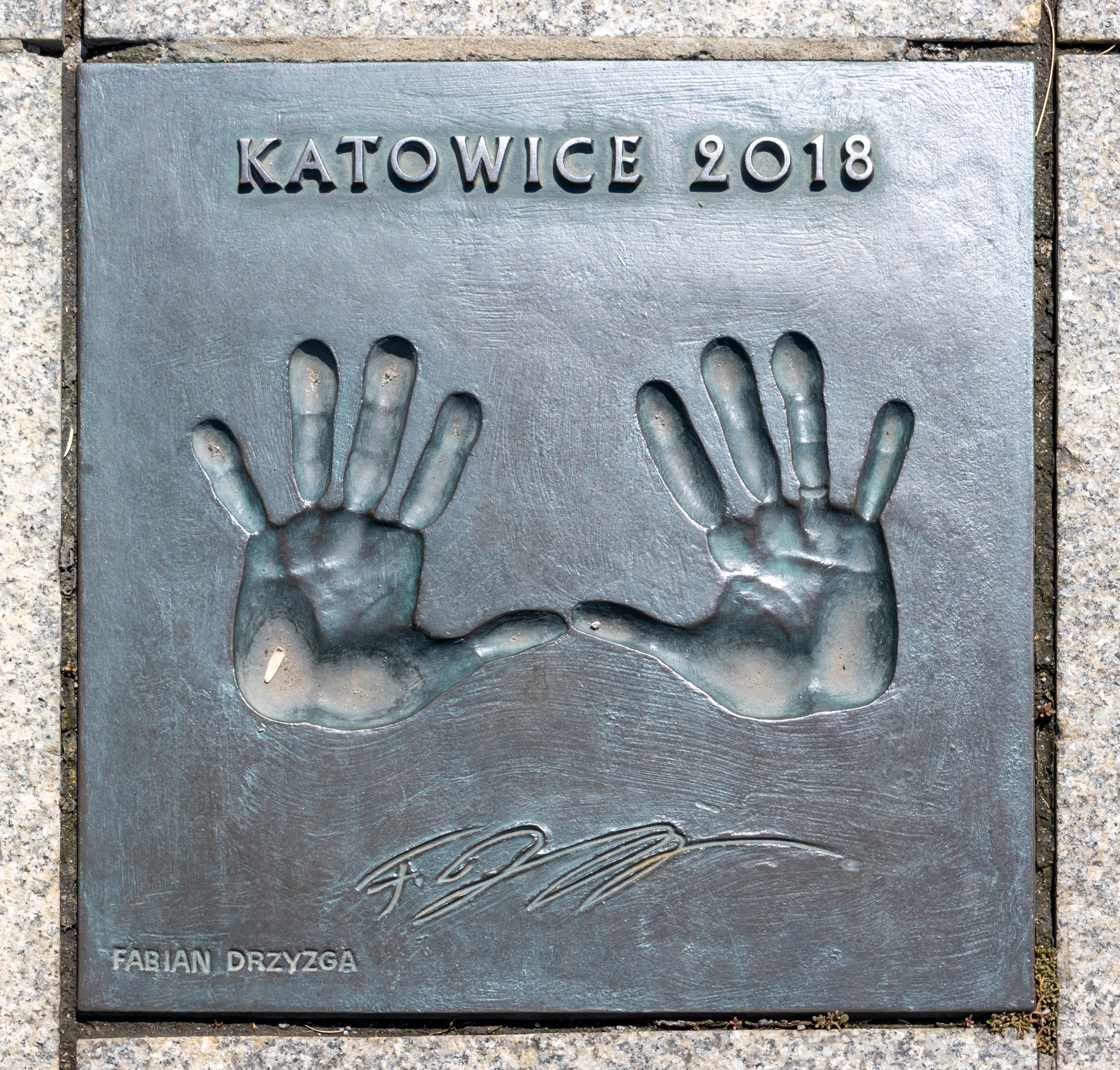
Hand prints and signature at the Avenue of Volleyball Stars, Katowice

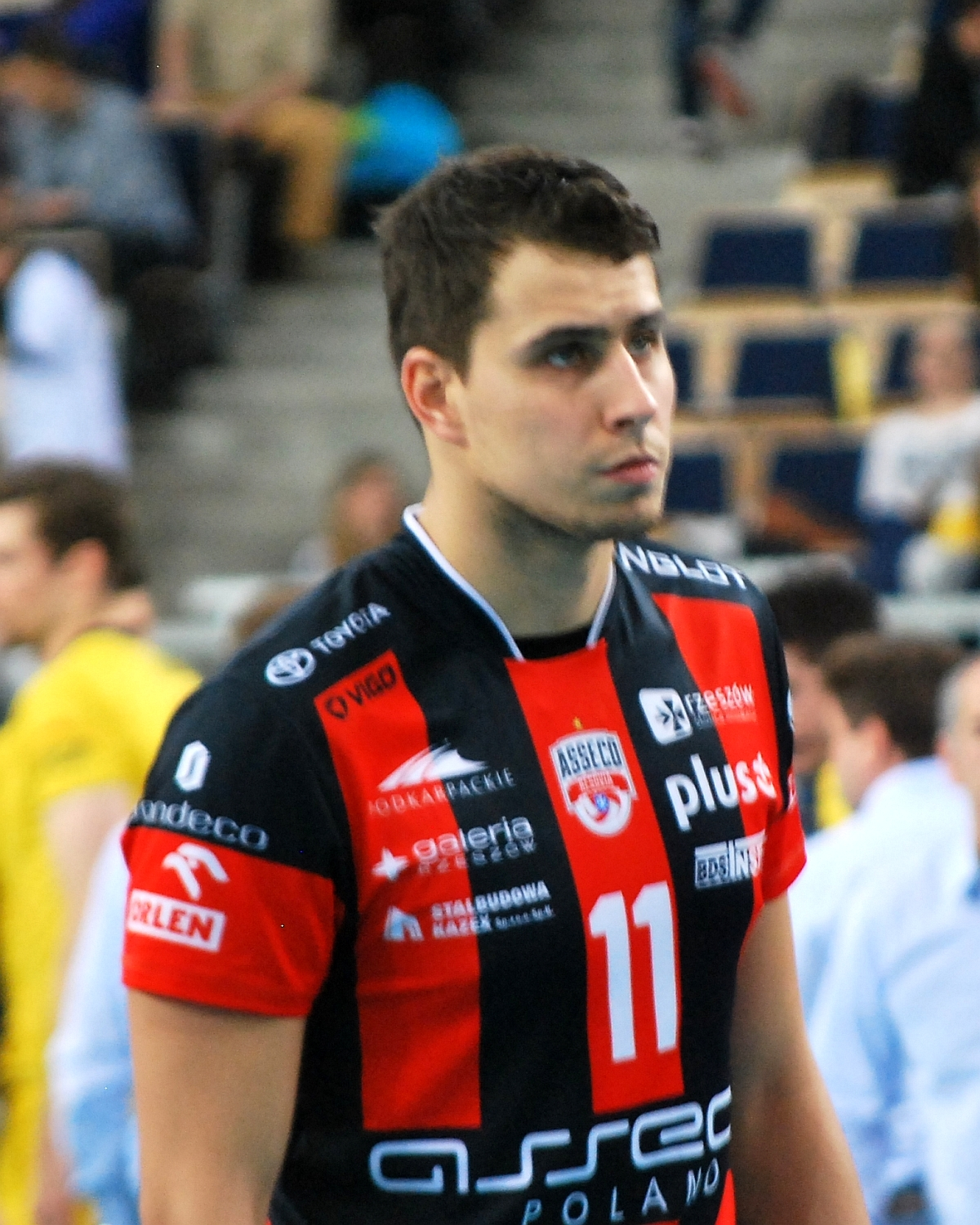

Fabian Drzyzga (born 3 January 1990) is a Polish professional volleyball player who plays as a setter for Stilon Gorzów. Drzyzga took part in two Olympic Games (Rio 2016, Tokyo 2020) and won the World Champion title in both 2014 and 2018.

== Personal life ==
Drzyzga was born in Bordeaux, France, because of his father Wojciech, a volleyball player and member of the French volleyball team, JSA Bordeaux. His father is currently a sports commentator giving a running commentary of Polish national team and PlusLiga matches. Fabian's brother, Tomasz, is a former volleyball player. On 3 September 2016 he married Monika Król. In March 2018 he announced via Instagram that they are expecting their first child.

== Career ==
=== Club ===
He joined AZS Częstochowa in 2008. In 2012, Częstochowa won the CEV Challenge Cup after the final matches against AZS Politechnika Warszawska. In 2012 he left the club from Częstochowa and joined AZS Politechnika Warszawska. After one season he changed club and signed a contract with the Polish Champion of 2012 and 2013 – Asseco Resovia. In the 2013–2014 season, Resovia won the Polish SuperCup and a silver medal of the Polish Championship 2013/2014 after losing the final (0–3 in matches, to three wins) against PGE Skra Bełchatów. On 29 March 2015 Asseco Resovia, including Drzyzga, achieved silver medal of the 2014–15 CEV Champions League. Drzyzga was named The Best Setter of the Final Four CEV Champions League. In April 2015 he signed next two-year contract until 2017. In April 2015 he achieved his first title of Polish Champion with club from Rzeszów. In June 2017, he moved to Olympiacos.

=== National team ===
Drzyzga debuted in the Polish national team in 2010, but also represented Poland as a cadet in the past. He won a silver medal of the U19 European Championship in 2007. He was appointed for the first time to the senior national team by Daniel Castellani in 2009. Drzyzga is a bronze medalist of the 2011 European Championship. On 16 August 2014, he was appointed to the national team at World Championship held in Poland. On 21 September 2014 he won a title of the World Champion. On 27 October 2014 he received a state award granted by the Polish President of that time Bronisław Komorowski – Gold Cross of Merit for outstanding sports achievements and worldwide promotion of Poland. On 30 September 2018 Poland achieved its third title of the World Champion. Poland beat Brazil in the final 3-0 and defended the title from 2014.

== Honours ==
=== Club ===
- CEV Champions League
  - 2014–15 – with Asseco Resovia
- CEV Cup
  - 2023–24 – with Asseco Resovia
- CEV Challenge Cup
  - 2011–12 – with AZS Częstochowa
  - 2017–18 – with Olympiacos
- Domestic
  - 2013–14 Polish SuperCup, with Asseco Resovia
  - 2014–15 Polish Championship, with Asseco Resovia
  - 2017–18 Greek League Cup, with Olympiacos
  - 2017–18 Greek Championship, with Olympiacos
  - 2019–20 Russian Championship, with Lokomotiv Novosibirsk
  - 2024–25 Turkish Cup, with Fenerbahçe

=== Youth national team ===
- 2007 CEV U19 European Championship

=== Individual awards ===
- 2015: CEV Champions League – Best setter
- 2015: Polish Cup – Best setter
- 2021: FIVB Nations League – Best setter

=== State awards ===
- 2014: Gold Cross of Merit
- 2018: Knight's Cross of Polonia Restituta
