= 2015 Boys' Youth European Volleyball Championship =

Tournament details
- Host country: Turkey
- Dates: April 4 – April 12
- Teams: 12
- Venues: 2 (in 2 host cities)

Final positions
- Champions: Poland (2nd title)

Tournament awards
- MVP: (Poland) Bartosz Kwolek

The 2015 Boys' Youth European Volleyball Championship was played in Kocaeli and Sakarya, Turkey from April 4 – 12, 2015. The top six teams were qualified for the 2015 Youth World Championship.

== Participating teams ==
- Host
  - Turkey
- Qualified through 2015 Boys' Youth European Volleyball Championship Qualification
  - Bulgaria
  - Czech Republic
  - Denmark
  - France
  - Germany
  - Italy
  - Poland
  - Romania
  - Russia
  - Serbia
  - Spain

== Pool composition ==
Pool I	Pool II
Russia	Turkey
France	Bulgaria
Poland	Czech Republic
Italy	Romania
Denmark	Germany
Serbia	Spain

== Pool standing procedure ==
1. Match points
2. Number of matches won
3. Sets ratio
4. Points ratio
5. Result of the last match between the tied teams

Match won 3–0 or 3–1: 3 match points for the winner, 0 match points for the loser
Match won 3–2: 2 match points for the winner, 1 match point for the loser

== Preliminary round ==
- All times are Eastern European Time (UTC+03:00)

=== Pool I ===
- Venue: Şehit Polis Recep Topaloğlu Spor Salonu, Kocaeli, Turkey

Pos	Team	Pld	W	L	Pts	SW	SL	SR	SPW	SPL	SPR	Qualification
1	Poland	5	5	0	14	15	3	5.000	433	328	1.320	Semifinals
2	Italy	5	4	1	12	14	5	2.800	445	363	1.226	Semifinals
3	Russia	5	3	2	9	10	6	1.667	369	356	1.037	5th–8th classification
4	Serbia	5	2	3	5	8	14	0.571	405	482	0.840	5th–8th classification
5	France	5	1	4	4	5	12	0.417	356	399	0.892	
6	Denmark	5	0	5	1	2	15	0.133	323	403	0.801	

Date	Time		Score		Set 1	Set 2	Set 3	Set 4	Set 5	Total	Report
4 Apr	14:30	Russia	3–0	Serbia	25–14	25–16	25–23			75–53	Report
4 Apr	17:00	Poland	3–2	Italy	25–27	26–24	19–25	25–17	15–7	110–100	Report
4 Apr	19:30	France	3–0	Denmark	25–16	25–19	25–17			75–52	Report
5 Apr	14:30	Serbia	2–3	Italy	25–18	25–23	20–25	14–25	7–15	91–106	Report
5 Apr	17:00	Denmark	0–3	Poland	15–25	20–25	22–25			57–75	Report
5 Apr	19:30	Russia	3–0	France	30–28	25–21	25–21			80–70	Report
6 Apr	14:30	Italy	3–0	Denmark	25–8	25–13	26–24			76–45	Report
6 Apr	17:00	Poland	3–1	Russia	25–16	22–25	25–20	26–24		98–85	Report
6 Apr	19:30	France	2–3	Serbia	27–29	25–23	25–22	13–25	15–17	105–116	Report
8 Apr	14:30	Russia	0–3	Italy	22–25	20–25	11–25			53–75	Report
8 Apr	17:00	France	0–3	Poland	9–25	16–25	17–25			42–75	Report
8 Apr	19:30	Serbia	3–2	Denmark	26–24	20–25	27–25	13–25	15–10	101–109	Report
9 Apr	14:30	Italy	3–0	France	25–22	25–18	26–24			76–64	Report
9 Apr	17:00	Poland	3–0	Serbia	25–15	25–12	25–17			75–44	Report
9 Apr	19:30	Denmark	0–3	Russia	19–25	17–25	24–26			60–76	Report

=== Pool II ===
- Venue: Sakarya Spor Salonu, Sakarya, Turkey

Pos	Team	Pld	W	L	Pts	SW	SL	SR	SPW	SPL	SPR	Qualification
1	Germany	5	4	1	12	13	4	3.250	426	376	1.133	Semifinals
2	Turkey	5	4	1	11	12	6	2.000	414	396	1.045	Semifinals
3	Bulgaria	5	3	2	10	8	7	1.143	431	381	1.131	5th–8th classification
4	Czech Republic	5	3	2	9	9	8	1.125	409	375	1.091	5th–8th classification
5	Spain	5	1	4	3	5	13	0.385	345	434	0.795	
6	Romania	5	0	5	0	4	15	0.267	396	459	0.863	

Date	Time		Score		Set 1	Set 2	Set 3	Set 4	Set 5	Total	Report
4 Apr	14:30	Czech Republic	3–1	Germany	25–22	28–26	25–27	25–22		103–97	Report
4 Apr	17:00	Turkey	3–2	Bulgaria	25–19	25–19	15–25	18–25	15–12	98–100	Report
4 Apr	19:30	Spain	3–1	Romania	20–25	25–18	25–23	26–24		96–90	Report
5 Apr	14:30	Germany	3–0	Bulgaria	26–24	25–22	25–17			76–63	Report
5 Apr	17:00	Romania	1–3	Turkey	25–27	17–25	25–18	21–25		88–95	Report
5 Apr	19:30	Czech Republic	3–0	Spain	25–16	25–11	25–19			75–46	Report
6 Apr	14:30	Bulgaria	3–1	Romania	20–25	25–20	25–18	25–14		95–77	Report
6 Apr	17:00	Turkey	3–0	Czech Republic	25–22	25–22	25–23			75–67	Report
6 Apr	19:30	Spain	1–3	Germany	19–25	17–25	25–21	19–25		80–96	Report
8 Apr	14:30	Czech Republic	0–3	Bulgaria	23–25	21–25	22–25			66–75	Report
8 Apr	17:00	Spain	0–3	Turkey	21–25	21–25	17–25			59–75	Report
8 Apr	19:30	Germany	3–0	Romania	25–21	25–18	25–20			75–59	Report
9 Apr	14:30	Bulgaria	3–1	Spain	25–15	23–25	25–12	25–12		98–64	Report
9 Apr	17:00	Turkey	0–3	Germany	25–27	28–30	18–25			71–82	Report
9 Apr	19:30	Romania	1–3	Czech Republic	19–25	24–26	25–22	14–25		82–98	Report

== Final round ==
- All times are Eastern European Time (UTC+03:00)
- Venue: Sakarya Spor Salonu, Sakarya, Turkey

=== 5th–8th place ===
5th–8th semifinals
11 April
Russia	3
Czech Republic	0
11 April
Bulgaria	3
Serbia	1

5th place match
12 April
Russia	3
Bulgaria	2
7th place match
12 April
Czech Republic	3
Serbia	0

==== 5th–8th place playoff ====
Date	Time		Score		Set 1	Set 2	Set 3	Set 4	Set 5	Total	Report
11 Apr	17:00	Russia	3–0	Czech Republic	25–22	26–24	25–11			76–57	Report
11 Apr	19:30	Bulgaria	3–1	Serbia	23–25	25–17	25–22	26–24		99–88	Report

==== 7th place ====
Date	Time		Score		Set 1	Set 2	Set 3	Set 4	Set 5	Total	Report
12 Apr	11:00	Czech Republic	3–0	Serbia	25–22	25–19	25–19			75–60	Report

==== 5th place ====
Date	Time		Score		Set 1	Set 2	Set 3	Set 4	Set 5	Total	Report
12 Apr	13:30	Russia	3–2	Bulgaria	25–17	22–25	21–25	25–23	15–9	108–99	Report

=== Championship round ===
Semifinals
11 April
Poland	3
Turkey	0
11 April
Germany	1
Italy	3

Final
12 April
Poland	3
Italy	1
3rd place
12 April
Turkey	3
Germany	1

==== Semifinal ====
Date	Time		Score		Set 1	Set 2	Set 3	Set 4	Set 5	Total	Report
11 Apr	14:30	Poland	3–0	Turkey	25–19	25–17	25–23			75–59	Report
11 Apr	12:00	Germany	1–3	Italy	17–25	22–25	25–22	20–25		84–97	Report

==== 3rd place ====
Date	Time		Score		Set 1	Set 2	Set 3	Set 4	Set 5	Total	Report
12 Apr	16:30	Turkey	3–1	Germany	25–19	25–19	22–25	25–18		97–81	Report

==== Final ====
Date	Time		Score		Set 1	Set 2	Set 3	Set 4	Set 5	Total	Report
12 Apr	19:00	Poland	3–1	Italy	25–15	25–13	25–27	25–22		100–77	Report

== Final standing ==
Rank	Team
1st place, gold medalist(s)	Poland
2nd place, silver medalist(s)	Italy
3rd place, bronze medalist(s)	Turkey
4	Germany
5	Russia
6	Bulgaria
7	Czech Republic
8	Serbia
9	France
10	Spain
11	Denmark
12	Romania

Qualified for the 2015 Boys' U19 World Championship

2015 Boys' U19 European champions

Poland
2nd title

14–man Roster
Patryk Niemiec, Bartosz Kwolek, Jakub Kochanowski, Łukasz Kozub, Jędrzej Gruszczyński, Jakub Ziobrowski, Damian Domagała, Kamil Droszyński, Dawid Woch, Mateusz Masłowski, Tomasz Fornal, Tomasz Polczyk
Head coach
Sebastian Pawlik

== Awards ==
- Most valuable player
  (Poland) Bartosz Kwolek
- Best scorer
  (Germany) Maximilian Auste
- Best blocker
  (Russia) Aleksei Kononov
- Best receiver
  (Turkey) Burak Cevik
- Best spiker
  (Turkey) Abdullah Cam
- Best server
  (Czech Republic) Matej Smidl
- Best setter
  (Poland) Kamil Droszyński
- Best libero
  (Italy) Alessandro Piccinelli

== See also ==
- 2015 Girls' Youth European Volleyball Championship
