= Bartłomiej Lemański =

Polish volleyball player (born 1996)

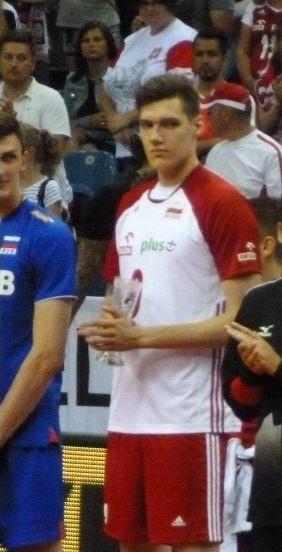

Personal information
- Nickname: Leman
- Born: 19 March 1996 (age 30); Warsaw, Poland
- Height: 2.17 m (7 ft 1 in)
- Weight: 104 kg (229 lb)
- Spike: 365 cm (144 in)

Volleyball information
- Position: Middle blocker
- Current club: Projekt Warsaw
- Number: 77

Career
Years	Teams
2012–2014; 2014–2016; 2016–2020; 2020–2021; 2021–2023; 2023–2026; 2026–	Metro Warszawa; AZS Politechnika Warszawska; Asseco Resovia; Stal Nysa; Czarni Radom; Skra Bełchatów; Projekt Warsaw

National team
2017–	Poland
Honours
Men's volleyball
Representing Poland
FIVB Nations League
Gold medal – first place	2026 Ningbo
CEV European Championship
Gold medal – first place	2026 Bulgaria/Finland/Italy/Romania

Bartłomiej Lemański (born 19 March 1996) is a Polish professional volleyball player who plays as a middle blocker for Projekt Warsaw and the Poland national team.

== Career ==
=== Club ===
In 2014–2016, Lemański spent two seasons on loan at AZS Politechnika Warszawska. He was in top 10 best blockers of the 2014–15 PlusLiga season. In 2016, he joined Asseco Resovia.

=== National team ===
In 2013, alongside his national team, he won the 2013 U19 World Championship bronze medal. Ferdinando De Giorgi called Lemański up for the 2017 World League.

== Honours ==
=== Youth national team ===
- 2013 CEV U19 European Championship
- 2013 European Youth Olympic Festival

=== Universiade ===
- 2019 Summer Universiade

=== Individual awards ===
- 2026: CEV European Championship – Best middle blocker
