= 2015 FIVB Volleyball Boys' U19 World Championship =

2015 Boys' U19 World Championship
Tournament details
- Host country: Argentina
- Dates: 14–23 August
- Teams: 20 (from 5 confederations)
- Venue: 2 (in 2 host cities)

Final positions
- Champions: Poland (1st title)
- Runners-up: Argentina
- Third place: Iran
- Fourth place: Russia

Tournament awards
- MVP: (Poland) Bartosz Kwolek
- Best Setter: (Poland) Kamil Droszyński
- Best OH: (Brazil) Kaio Ribeiro (Argentina) Jan Martínez Franchi
- Best MB: (United States) Scott Stadick (Iran) Ali Asghar Mojarrad
- Best OPP: (Russia) Dmitry Yakovlev
- Best Libero: (Brazil) Alexandre Figueiredo

The 2015 FIVB Volleyball Boys' U19 World Championship was held in Resistencia and Corrientes, Argentina from 14 to 23 August 2015.

== Qualification ==
The FIVB Sports Events Council confirmed a proposal to streamline the number of teams participating in the Age Group World Championships on 14 December 2013.

Method of Qualification	Date	Venue	Vacancies	Qualified
2014 NORCECA Youth Championship	12–20 July 2014	(United States) Tulsa	3	United States
2014 NORCECA Youth Championship	12–20 July 2014	(United States) Tulsa	3	Cuba
2014 NORCECA Youth Championship	12–20 July 2014	(United States) Tulsa	3	Mexico
2014 Asian Youth Championship	5–13 September 2014	(Sri Lanka) Colombo	4	Iran
2014 Asian Youth Championship	5–13 September 2014	(Sri Lanka) Colombo	4	Japan
2014 Asian Youth Championship	5–13 September 2014	(Sri Lanka) Colombo	4	China
2014 Asian Youth Championship	5–13 September 2014	(Sri Lanka) Colombo	4	Chinese Taipei
2014 South American Youth Championship	10–13 September 2014	(Colombia) Paipa	2	Argentina
2014 South American Youth Championship	10–13 September 2014	(Colombia) Paipa	2	Brazil
2015 U19 African Championship	21–24 January 2015	(Tunisia) Kelibia	1	Egypt
2015 European Youth Championship	4–12 April 2015	(Turkey) Kocaeli & Sakarya	6	Poland
2015 European Youth Championship	4–12 April 2015	(Turkey) Kocaeli & Sakarya	6	Italy
2015 European Youth Championship	4–12 April 2015	(Turkey) Kocaeli & Sakarya	6	Turkey
2015 European Youth Championship	4–12 April 2015	(Turkey) Kocaeli & Sakarya	6	Germany
2015 European Youth Championship	4–12 April 2015	(Turkey) Kocaeli & Sakarya	6	Russia
2015 European Youth Championship	4–12 April 2015	(Turkey) Kocaeli & Sakarya	6	Bulgaria
U19 World Ranking	December 2014	(Switzerland) Lausanne	3	Chile
U19 World Ranking	December 2014	(Switzerland) Lausanne	3	France
U19 World Ranking	December 2014	(Switzerland) Lausanne	3	Belgium*
U19 World Ranking for NORCECA	December 2014	(Dominican Republic) Santo Domingo	1	Puerto Rico
Total			20	

* South Korea was the 3rd highest team in the U19 World Ranking which were not yet qualified, but they declined participation.

== Pools composition ==
Teams were seeded in the first two positions of each pool following the Serpentine system according to their FIVB U19 World Ranking as of December 2014. FIVB reserved the right to seed the hosts as head of Pool A regardless of the U19 World Ranking. All teams not seeded were drawn to take other available positions in the remaining lines, following the U19 World Ranking. The draw was held in Resistencia, Argentina on 24 June 2015. Rankings are shown in brackets except the hosts who ranked 5th.

Pool A	Pool B	Pool C	Pool D
Argentina (Hosts)	China (1)	Iran (2)	Russia (2)
United States (8)	Cuba (7)	Poland (5)	Brazil (4)
France (12)	Mexico (10)	Chile (9)	Japan (10)
Belgium (14)	Egypt (19)	Chinese Taipei (15)	Puerto Rico (15)
Turkey (22)	Italy (37)	Bulgaria (37)	Germany (37)

== Venues ==
Pool A, B and Final round	Pool C, D and Final round
Resistencia, Argentina	Corrientes, Argentina
Microestadio Raúl Alejo Gronda	Estadio José Jorge Conte
Capacity: 4,000	Capacity: 5,000
No Image	

== Pool standing procedure ==
1. Number of matches won
2. Match points
3. Sets ratio
4. Points ratio
5. Result of the last match between the tied teams

Match won 3–0 or 3–1: 3 match points for the winner, 0 match points for the loser
Match won 3–2: 2 match points for the winner, 1 match point for the loser

== Preliminary round ==
- All times are Argentina Time (UTC−03:00).

=== Pool A ===
Pos	Team	Pld	W	L	Pts	SW	SL	SR	SPW	SPL	SPR	Qualification
1	United States	4	4	0	10	12	5	2.400	388	363	1.069	Round of 16
2	Argentina	4	3	1	8	9	7	1.286	373	356	1.048	Round of 16
3	Turkey	4	2	2	7	9	7	1.286	354	345	1.026	Round of 16
4	France	4	1	3	4	6	10	0.600	350	372	0.941	Round of 16
5	Belgium	4	0	4	1	5	12	0.417	369	398	0.927	17th–20th places

Date	Time		Score		Set 1	Set 2	Set 3	Set 4	Set 5	Total	Report
14 Aug	17:30	United States	3–2	Turkey	25–18	18–25	26–24	22–25	15–13	106–105	P2 P3
14 Aug	21:00	France	2–3	Argentina	25–16	23–25	27–25	27–29	12–15	114–110	P2 P3
15 Aug	17:30	France	0–3	Turkey	20–25	22–25	12–25			54–75	P2 P3
15 Aug	21:00	Belgium	2–3	United States	20–25	25–17	18–25	25–21	17–19	105–107	P2 P3
16 Aug	17:30	Belgium	1–3	France	22–25	25–21	22–25	19–25		88–96	P2 P3
16 Aug	21:00	Argentina	3–1	Turkey	22–25	25–18	25–18	25–17		97–78	P2 P3
17 Aug	17:30	United States	3–1	France	26–24	25–21	23–25	25–16		99–86	P2 P3
17 Aug	21:00	Belgium	1–3	Argentina	23–25	20–25	26–24	19–25		88–99	P2 P3
18 Aug	17:30	Belgium	1–3	Turkey	22–25	25–21	23–25	18–25		88–96	P2 P3
18 Aug	21:00	United States	3–0	Argentina	25–20	26–24	25–23			76–67	P2 P3

=== Pool B ===
Pos	Team	Pld	W	L	Pts	SW	SL	SR	SPW	SPL	SPR	Qualification
1	Italy	4	3	1	10	11	5	2.200	369	312	1.183	Round of 16
2	China	4	3	1	8	10	5	2.000	349	322	1.084	Round of 16
3	Cuba	4	2	2	6	7	7	1.000	311	312	0.997	Round of 16
4	Mexico	4	2	2	6	7	7	1.000	317	329	0.964	Round of 16
5	Egypt	4	0	4	0	1	12	0.083	252	323	0.780	17th–20th places

Date	Time		Score		Set 1	Set 2	Set 3	Set 4	Set 5	Total	Report
14 Aug	09:00	Cuba	0–3	Italy	17–25	17–25	16–25			50–75	P2 P3
14 Aug	11:15	Mexico	3–0	Egypt	25–22	25–20	25–22			75–64	P2 P3
15 Aug	09:00	Mexico	1–3	Italy	17–25	25–21	19–25	18–25		79–96	P2 P3
15 Aug	11:30	China	1–3	Cuba	15–25	22–25	25–18	22–25		84–93	P2 P3
16 Aug	09:00	China	3–0	Mexico	26–24	25–17	25–21			76–62	P2 P3
16 Aug	11:00	Egypt	1–3	Italy	16–25	25–20	12–25	19–25		72–95	P2 P3
17 Aug	09:00	China	3–0	Egypt	26–24	27–25	25–15			78–64	P2 P3
17 Aug	11:00	Cuba	1–3	Mexico	25–27	20–25	26–24	22–25		93–101	P2 P3
18 Aug	09:00	Cuba	3–0	Egypt	25–19	25–20	25–13			75–52	P2 P3
18 Aug	11:00	China	3–2	Italy	26–24	22–25	22–25	25–15	16–14	111–103	P2 P3

=== Pool C ===
Pos	Team	Pld	W	L	Pts	SW	SL	SR	SPW	SPL	SPR	Qualification
1	Poland	4	4	0	12	12	2	6.000	344	284	1.211	Round of 16
2	Iran	4	3	1	9	10	4	2.500	333	265	1.257	Round of 16
3	Bulgaria	4	2	2	5	8	8	1.000	346	361	0.958	Round of 16
4	Chile	4	1	3	2	3	11	0.273	269	330	0.815	Round of 16
5	Chinese Taipei	4	0	4	2	4	12	0.333	316	368	0.859	17th–20th places

Date	Time		Score		Set 1	Set 2	Set 3	Set 4	Set 5	Total	Report
14 Aug	09:03	Chile	3–2	Chinese Taipei	22–25	25–22	23–25	25–19	16–14	111–105	P2 P3
14 Aug	11:50	Poland	3–1	Bulgaria	25–18	23–25	25–23	25–22		98–88	P2 P3
15 Aug	09:00	Chile	0–3	Bulgaria	19–25	15–25	22–25			56–75	P2 P3
15 Aug	11:00	Iran	1–3	Poland	25–20	24–26	18–25	15–25		82–96	P2 P3
16 Aug	09:00	Chinese Taipei	2–3	Bulgaria	25–23	25–16	19–25	26–28	11–15	106–107	P2 P3
16 Aug	11:45	Iran	3–0	Chile	25–11	25–14	25–21			75–46	P2 P3
17 Aug	09:00	Poland	3–0	Chile	25–14	25–19	25–23			75–56	P2 P3
17 Aug	11:10	Iran	3–0	Chinese Taipei	25–15	25–16	25–16			75–47	P2 P3
18 Aug	09:00	Iran	3–1	Bulgaria	25–20	25–14	26–28	25–14		101–76	P2 P3
18 Aug	11:35	Poland	3–0	Chinese Taipei	25–21	25–20	25–17			75–58	P2 P3

=== Pool D ===
Pos	Team	Pld	W	L	Pts	SW	SL	SR	SPW	SPL	SPR	Qualification
1	Brazil	4	4	0	11	12	3	4.000	352	286	1.231	Round of 16
2	Russia	4	3	1	9	10	3	3.333	321	275	1.167	Round of 16
3	Germany	4	2	2	6	8	8	1.000	353	357	0.989	Round of 16
4	Japan	4	1	3	3	5	11	0.455	322	352	0.915	Round of 16
5	Puerto Rico	4	0	4	1	2	12	0.167	257	335	0.767	17th–20th places

Date	Time		Score		Set 1	Set 2	Set 3	Set 4	Set 5	Total	Report
14 Aug	17:30	Japan	3–2	Puerto Rico	25–16	23–25	18–25	25–18	15–10	106–94	P2 P3
14 Aug	21:20	Brazil	3–2	Germany	20–25	25–20	20–25	25–20	15–9	105–99	P2 P3
15 Aug	17:31	Japan	2–3	Germany	25–23	24–26	24–26	25–18	9–15	107–108	P2 P3
15 Aug	21:00	Russia	1–3	Brazil	25–22	21–25	19–25	23–25		88–97	P2 P3
16 Aug	17:30	Russia	3–0	Japan	25–20	25–16	25–17			75–53	P2 P3
16 Aug	21:00	Puerto Rico	0–3	Germany	18–25	27–29	17–25			62–79	P2 P3
17 Aug	17:30	Russia	3–0	Puerto Rico	25–15	25–20	25–23			75–58	P2 P3
17 Aug	21:00	Brazil	3–0	Japan	25–18	25–21	25–17			75–56	P2 P3
18 Aug	17:30	Russia	3–0	Germany	25–22	25–14	33–31			83–67	P2 P3
18 Aug	21:00	Brazil	3–0	Puerto Rico	25–14	25–14	25–15			75–43	P2 P3

== Final round ==
- All times are Argentina Time (UTC−03:00).

=== 17th–20th places ===
Pos	Team	Pld	W	L	Pts	SW	SL	SR	SPW	SPL	SPR
1	Belgium	3	3	0	8	9	2	4.500	259	202	1.282
2	Chinese Taipei	3	2	1	5	6	6	1.000	259	275	0.942
3	Puerto Rico	3	1	2	5	7	6	1.167	280	286	0.979
4	Egypt	3	0	3	0	1	9	0.111	213	248	0.859

Date	Time	Venue		Score		Set 1	Set 2	Set 3	Set 4	Set 5	Total	Report
19 Aug	15:00	JJC	Chinese Taipei	3–2	Puerto Rico	24–26	32–34	25–20	25–17	16–14	122–111	P2 P3
19 Aug	15:00	RAG	Belgium	3–0	Egypt	28–26	25–21	25–19			78–66	P2 P3
21 Aug	11:00	JJC	Egypt	0–3	Puerto Rico	22–25	21–25	15–25			58–75	P2 P3
21 Aug	11:00	RAG	Belgium	3–0	Chinese Taipei	25–11	25–9	25–22			75–42	P2 P3
22 Aug	11:00	JJC	Puerto Rico	2–3	Belgium	25–21	20–25	25–20	17–25	7–15	94–106	P2 P3
22 Aug	11:00	RAG	Chinese Taipei	3–1	Egypt	19–25	25–17	26–24	25–23		95–89	P2 P3

=== Final sixteen ===
Round of 16
19 August – Resistencia
Italy	3
France	2
19 August – Corrientes
Iran	3
Germany	0
19 August – Resistencia
China	3
Turkey	0
19 August – Corrientes
Poland	3
Japan	1
19 August – Corrientes
Brazil	3
Chile	0
19 August – Resistencia
Argentina	3
Cuba	0
19 August – Corrientes
Russia	3
Bulgaria	1
19 August – Resistencia
United States	3
Mexico	0

Quarterfinals
21 August – Resistencia
Italy	2
Iran	3
21 August – Resistencia
China	0
Poland	3
21 August – Resistencia
Brazil	1
Argentina	3
21 August – Resistencia
Russia	3
United States	0

Semifinals
22 August – Resistencia
Iran	1
Poland	3
22 August – Resistencia
Argentina	3
Russia	2

Final
23 August – Resistencia
Poland	3
Argentina	2
3rd place match
23 August – Resistencia
Iran	3
Russia	1

5th–8th semifinals
22 August – Resistencia
Italy	3
China	0
22 August – Resistencia
Brazil	3
United States	2

5th place match
23 August – Resistencia
Italy	3
Brazil	0
7th place match
23 August – Resistencia
China	0
United States	3

9th–16th quarterfinals
21 August – Corrientes
France	3
Germany	2
21 August – Corrientes
Turkey	3
Japan	1
21 August – Corrientes
Chile	0
Cuba	3
21 August – Corrientes
Bulgaria	3
Mexico	0

9th–12th semifinals
22 August – Corrientes
France	2
Turkey	3
22 August – Corrientes
Cuba	3
Bulgaria	2

9th place match
23 August – Corrientes
Turkey	3
Cuba	0
11th place match
23 August – Corrientes
France	3
Bulgaria	2

13th–16th semifinals
22 August – Corrientes
Germany	3
Japan	0
22 August – Corrientes
Chile	2
Mexico	3

13th place match
23 August – Corrientes
Germany	3
Mexico	1
15th place match
23 August – Corrientes
Japan	3
Chile	0

==== Round of 16 ====
Date	Time	Venue		Score		Set 1	Set 2	Set 3	Set 4	Set 5	Total	Report
19 Aug	09:00	RAG	Italy	3–2	France	25–15	19–25	21–25	25–21	15–11	105–97	P2 P3
19 Aug	09:00	JJC	Iran	3–0	Germany	25–14	25–18	25–22			75–54	P2 P3
19 Aug	11:00	JJC	Poland	3–1	Japan	20–25	25–15	25–11	25–13		95–64	P2 P3
19 Aug	12:00	RAG	China	3–0	Turkey	25–19	25–22	25–20			75–61	P2 P3
19 Aug	17:30	RAG	United States	3–0	Mexico	25–18	25–16	25–22			75–56	P2 P3
19 Aug	18:07	JJC	Brazil	3–0	Chile	25–16	25–16	25–17			75–49	P2 P3
19 Aug	20:15	JJC	Russia	3–1	Bulgaria	25–20	25–19	23–25	25–17		98–81	P2 P3
19 Aug	21:00	RAG	Argentina	3–0	Cuba	26–24	25–20	25–19			76–63	P2 P3

==== 9th–16th quarterfinals ====
Date	Time	Venue		Score		Set 1	Set 2	Set 3	Set 4	Set 5	Total	Report
21 Aug	14:30	JJC	Bulgaria	3–0	Mexico	25–19	25–18	25–23			75–60	P2 P3
21 Aug	16:30	JJC	Chile	0–3	Cuba	17–25	14–25	23–25			54–75	P2 P3
21 Aug	19:00	JJC	Turkey	3–1	Japan	25–21	25–22	16–25	25–19		91–87	P2 P3
21 Aug	21:00	JJC	France	3–2	Germany	22–25	25–23	15–25	25–22	15–13	102–108	P2 P3

==== Quarterfinals ====
Date	Time	Venue		Score		Set 1	Set 2	Set 3	Set 4	Set 5	Total	Report
21 Aug	14:30	RAG	Russia	3–0	United States	25–22	25–20	25–23			75–65	P2 P3
21 Aug	16:45	RAG	Italy	2–3	Iran	25–17	25–22	20–25	20–25	11–15	101–104	P2 P3
21 Aug	19:45	RAG	China	0–3	Poland	19–25	17–25	22–25			58–75	P2 P3
21 Aug	21:45	RAG	Brazil	1–3	Argentina	24–26	25–21	22–25	20–25		91–97	P2 P3

==== 13th–16th semifinals ====
Date	Time	Venue		Score		Set 1	Set 2	Set 3	Set 4	Set 5	Total	Report
22 Aug	14:30	JJC	Chile	2–3	Mexico	25–23	25–16	23–25	14–25	12–15	99–104	P2 P3
22 Aug	16:30	JJC	Germany	3–0	Japan	25–16	25–21	28–26			78–63	P2 P3

==== 9th–12th semifinals ====
Date	Time	Venue		Score		Set 1	Set 2	Set 3	Set 4	Set 5	Total	Report
22 Aug	19:00	JJC	Cuba	3–2	Bulgaria	16–25	21–25	25–20	28–26	15–12	105–108	P2 P3
22 Aug	21:00	JJC	France	2–3	Turkey	16–25	25–21	25–21	22–25	12–15	100–107	P2 P3

==== 5th–8th semifinals ====
Date	Time	Venue		Score		Set 1	Set 2	Set 3	Set 4	Set 5	Total	Report
22 Aug	14:30	RAG	Italy	3–0	China	25–16	25–17	26–24			76–57	P2 P3
22 Aug	19:10	RAG	Brazil	3–2	United States	25–21	22–25	25–22	15–25	15–10	102–103	P2 P3

==== Semifinals ====
Date	Time	Venue		Score		Set 1	Set 2	Set 3	Set 4	Set 5	Total	Report
22 Aug	16:30	RAG	Iran	1–3	Poland	25–18	21–25	20–25	22–25		88–93	P2 P3
22 Aug	22:10	RAG	Argentina	3–2	Russia	25–22	20–25	23–25	25–21	15–11	108–104	P2 P3

==== 15th place match ====
Date	Time	Venue		Score		Set 1	Set 2	Set 3	Set 4	Set 5	Total	Report
23 Aug	10:00	JJC	Japan	3–0	Chile	25–22	25–23	25–19			75–64	P2 P3

==== 13th place match ====
Date	Time	Venue		Score		Set 1	Set 2	Set 3	Set 4	Set 5	Total	Report
23 Aug	12:30	JJC	Germany	3–1	Mexico	26–28	25–18	25–15	25–20		101–81	P2 P3

==== 11th place match ====
Date	Time	Venue		Score		Set 1	Set 2	Set 3	Set 4	Set 5	Total	Report
23 Aug	15:00	JJC	France	3–2	Bulgaria	29–27	23–25	25–20	20–25	15–11	112–108	P2 P3

==== 9th place match ====
Date	Time	Venue		Score		Set 1	Set 2	Set 3	Set 4	Set 5	Total	Report
23 Aug	17:45	JJC	Turkey	3–0	Cuba	25–11	35–33	26–24			86–68	P2 P3

==== 7th place match ====
Date	Time	Venue		Score		Set 1	Set 2	Set 3	Set 4	Set 5	Total	Report
23 Aug	11:00	RAG	China	0–3	United States	21–25	23–25	15–25			59–75	P2 P3

==== 5th place match ====
Date	Time	Venue		Score		Set 1	Set 2	Set 3	Set 4	Set 5	Total	Report
23 Aug	14:30	RAG	Italy	3–0	Brazil	25–20	25–22	25–21			75–63	P2 P3

==== 3rd place match ====
Date	Time	Venue		Score		Set 1	Set 2	Set 3	Set 4	Set 5	Total	Report
23 Aug	17:00	RAG	Iran	3–1	Russia	25–17	26–28	25–16	25–23		101–84	P2 P3

==== Final ====
Date	Time	Venue		Score		Set 1	Set 2	Set 3	Set 4	Set 5	Total	Report
23 Aug	19:30	RAG	Poland	3–2	Argentina	22–25	25–23	28–30	25–18	15–7	115–103	P2 P3

== Final standing ==
Rank	Team
1st place, gold medalist(s)	Poland
2nd place, silver medalist(s)	Argentina
3rd place, bronze medalist(s)	Iran
4	Russia
5	Italy
6	Brazil
7	United States
8	China
9	Turkey
10	Cuba
11	France
12	Bulgaria
13	Germany
14	Mexico
15	Japan
16	Chile
17	Belgium
18	Chinese Taipei
19	Puerto Rico
20	Egypt

2015 Boys' U19 World champions

Poland
1st title

12–man roster
Patryk Niemiec, Bartosz Kwolek, Jakub Kochanowski (c), Łukasz Kozub, Jakub Szymański, Jędrzej Gruszczyński, Jakub Ziobrowski, Damian Domagała, Kamil Droszyński, Dawid Woch, Mateusz Masłowski, Tomasz Fornal
Head coach
Sebastian Pawlik

== Awards ==
- Most valuable player
  (Poland) Bartosz Kwolek
- Best setter
  (Poland) Kamil Droszyński
- Best outside spikers
  (Brazil) Kaio Ribeiro
  (Argentina) Jan Martínez Franchi
- Best middle blockers
  (United States) Scott Stadick
  (Iran) Aliasghar Mojarad
- Best opposite spiker
  (Russia) Dmitry Yakovlev
- Best libero
  (Brazil) Alexandre Figueiredo

== See also ==
- 2015 FIVB Volleyball Girls' U18 World Championship
