= Mateusz Masłowski =

Polish volleyball player (born 1997)

Personal information
- Born: 13 June 1997 (age 29); Rzeszów, Poland
- Height: 1.85 m (6 ft 1 in)
- Weight: 78 kg (172 lb)
- Spike: 330 cm (130 in)

Volleyball information
- Position: Libero
- Current club: Stilon Gorzów
- Number: 3

Career
Years	Teams
2016–2019; 2019–2023; 2023–2024; 2024–2025; 2026–	Asseco Resovia; Czarni Radom; Cuprum Lubin; Norwid Częstochowa; Stilon Gorzów

Mateusz Masłowski (born 13 June 1997) is a Polish professional volleyball player who plays as a libero for Stilon Gorzów.

== Personal life ==
His father, Grzegorz Masłowski is a former volleyball player, 1987 Polish Cup winner.

== Career ==
=== Club ===
In May 2016, he signed a 3–year contract with the senior team of Asseco Resovia.

=== National team ===
On 23 April 2015 the Poland men's national under-19 volleyball team, including Masłowski, won a title of the U19 European Champion. They beat Italy in the final (3–1). He took part in the 2015 European Youth Olympic Festival with Polish national U19 team. On 1 August 2015 he achieved a gold medal (final match with Bulgaria 3–0). On 23 August 2015 Poland achieved its first title of the U19 World Champion. In the final his team beat hosts – Argentina (3–2). On 10 September 2016 he achieved a title of the U20 European Champion after winning 7 out of 7 matches in the tournament and beating Ukraine in the final (3–1). On 2 July 2017 Poland, including Masłowski, achieved a title of the U21 World Champion after beating Cuba in the final (3–0). His national team won 47 matches in the row and never lost. The U21 World Champion title ended up his time in youth national teams.

== Honours ==
=== Club ===
- Domestic
  - 2013–14 Polish SuperCup, with Asseco Resovia
  - 2013–14 Polish Championship, with Asseco Resovia

=== Youth national team ===
- 2015 CEV U19 European Championship
- 2015 European Youth Olympic Festival
- 2015 FIVB U19 World Championship
- 2016 CEV U20 European Championship
- 2017 FIVB U21 World Championship

=== Universiade ===
- 2019 Summer Universiade
