= Stilon Gorzów (volleyball) =

Polish volleyball club

- Full name: Cuprum Gorzów Spółka Akcyjna
- Founded: 2001; 25 years ago as Cuprum Lubin
- Ground: Arena Gorzów ul. Słowiańska 16; Gorzów Wielkopolski (Capacity: 5,191)
- Chairman: Tomasz Tycel
- Manager: Hubert Henno
- Captain: Fabian Drzyzga
- League: Tauron Liga
- 2025–26: 12th place
- Website: Club home page

Uniforms
Home	Away

Stilon Gorzów – is a Polish professional men's volleyball club based in Gorzów Wielkopolski, founded in 2001 as Cuprum Lubin. The club was promoted to the highest level of the Polish Volleyball League in 2014.

== Club history ==
On 13 April 2024, it was announced that the Cuprum Lubin team would be moved to Gorzów Wielkopolski and renamed as Cuprum Stilon Gorzów, as a result of a merger with Agencja Inwestycyjna Stilon Gorzów.

== Team ==
As of 2026–27 season

No.	Name	Date of birth	Position
1	(Poland) Igor Nurkiewicz	9 June 2007 (age 19)	middle blocker
2	(Ukraine) Illia Kovalov	31 August 1996 (age 30)	outside hitter
3	(Poland) Mateusz Masłowski	13 June 1997 (age 29)	libero
6	(Serbia) Lazar Marinović	7 June 1998 (age 28)	outside hitter
7	(Poland) Dawid Siwczyk	13 June 1993 (age 33)	middle blocker
9	(Poland) Dawid Dulski	1 November 2002 (age 23)	opposite
11	(Poland) Fabian Drzyzga	3 January 1990 (age 36)	setter
13	(Poland) Mateusz Maciejewicz	12 March 2002 (age 24)	setter
15	(Poland) Jakub Czerwiński	22 July 2001 (age 25)	outside hitter
17	(Poland) Jakub Jurczyk	17 February 2006 (age 20)	libero
18	(Poland) Bartłomiej Mordyl	21 January 1995 (age 31)	middle blocker
19	(Serbia) Aleksandar Stefanović	22 November 1998 (age 27)	middle blocker
21	(Poland) Marcel Kiciński	20 March 2007 (age 19)	opposite
23	(Poland) Wojciech Więcławski	17 April 2005 (age 21)	outside hitter
Head coach:		(France) Hubert Henno	

== Former names ==
Years	Name
2014–2023	Cuprum Lubin
2023–2024	KGHM Cuprum Lubin
2024–2026	Cuprum Stilon Gorzów
2026–present	Stilon Gorzów
