= Poland men's national under-19 volleyball team =

Poland U19
- Nickname(s): The White and Reds
- Association: Polski Związek Piłki Siatkowej
- Confederation: CEV

Uniforms
| Home | Away |
- Official website (in Polish)
Honours
Medal record
U19 World Championship
| Gold medal – first place | 2015 Argentina |
| Gold medal – first place | 2021 Iran |
| Silver medal – second place | 2025 Uzbekistan |
| Bronze medal – third place | 1999 Saudi Arabia |
| Bronze medal – third place | 2013 Mexico |
U19 European Championship
| Gold medal – first place | 2005 Latvia |
| Gold medal – first place | 2015 Turkey |
| Silver medal – second place | 2001 Czech Republic |
| Silver medal – second place | 2003 Croatia |
| Silver medal – second place | 2007 Austria |
| Silver medal – second place | 2013 Bosnia and Herzegovina/Serbia |
| Bronze medal – third place | 1995 Spain |
| Bronze medal – third place | 1997 Slovakia |
U18 European Championship
| Gold medal – first place | 2026 Italy |
| Bronze medal – third place | 2020 Italy |
| Bronze medal – third place | 2024 Bulgaria |

The Poland men's national under-19 volleyball team is controlled by the Polski Związek Piłki Siatkowej (PZPS), which represents the country in international competitions – U18 European Championship and U19 World Championship.

== History ==
On April 12, 2015 Poland under-19 national team won title of U19 European Champion 2015. They beat in final Italy U19 (3–1). Same team took part in European Youth Olympic Festival. On August 1, 2015 he achieved gold medal (final match with Bulgaria 3–0). Then Polish national U19 team took part in 2015 FIVB U19 World Championship, held in Argentina. They beat in Pool C all opponents (Chinese Taipei, Chile, Bulgaria and Iran) and lost only 2 sets. Then they best Japan (3–0) in round of 16 and went straight to semifinal. On August 22, 2015 Polish national U19 team won semifinal after meeting with Iran (3–1). U19 team qualified to final match for the first time in history. It will be third medal of Poland U19 at World Championship under-19. On August 23, 2015 Poland achieved first title of U19 World Champion. In the finale they beat hosts - Argentina (3–2). The same squad of national team, led by coach Sebastian Pawlik, won 48 matches in the row and never lost (counted also later played under-21 tournaments). The squad roster, consisting mainly of players from the year 1997, has won all possible European and World championships under-19 and under-21.

== Statistics ==
=== U19 World Championship ===
Champions Runners up Third place

U19 World Championship record
| Year | Round | Position | GP | MW | ML | SW | SL |
|---|---|---|---|---|---|---|---|
| (United Arab Emirates) 1989 | Did not qualify | | | | | | |
| (Portugal) 1991 | Did not qualify | | | | | | |
| (Turkey) 1993 | | 9th | | | | | |
| (Puerto Rico) 1995 | Did not qualify | | | | | | |
| (Iran) 1997 | Semifinals | 4th | 7 | 5 | 2 | 16 | 14 |
| (Saudi Arabia) 1999 | Semifinals | 3rd | | | | | |
| (Egypt) 2001 | 5th–8th places | 5th | 7 | 5 | 2 | 17 | 7 |
| (Thailand) 2003 | Preliminary Round | 13th | 3 | 0 | 3 | 1 | 9 |
| (Algeria) 2005 | 5th–8th places | 7th | 7 | 4 | 3 | 13 | 11 |
| (Mexico) 2007 | 5th–8th places | 5th | 8 | 6 | 2 | 22 | 14 |
| (Italy) 2009 | 9th–12th places | 11th | 8 | 3 | 5 | 15 | 18 |
| (Argentina) 2011 | Did not qualify | | | | | | |
| (Mexico) 2013 | Semifinals | 3rd | 8 | 7 | 1 | 22 | 7 |
| (Argentina) 2015 | Final | 1st | 8 | 8 | 0 | 24 | 6 |
| (Bahrain) 2017 | 17th–20th places | 17th | 7 | 2 | 5 | 12 | 15 |
| (Tunisia) 2019 | Did not qualify | | | | | | |
| (Iran) 2021 | Final | 1st | 8 | 8 | 0 | 24 | 1 |
| (Argentina) 2023 | Did not qualify | | | | | | |
| (Uzbekistan) 2025 | Final | 2nd | 9 | 6 | 3 | 22 | 15 |
| Total | 2 Titles | 13/19 | | | | | |

=== U19 European Championship ===
Champions Runners up Third place

U19 European Championship record
| Year | Round | Position | GP | MW | ML | SW | SL |
|---|---|---|---|---|---|---|---|
| (Spain) 1995 | Semifinals | 3rd | 5 | 4 | 1 | 12 | 7 |
| (Slovakia) 1997 | Semifinals | 3rd | 5 | 4 | 1 | 14 | 4 |
| (Poland) 1999 | Semifinals | 4th | 5 | 3 | 2 | 12 | 8 |
| (Czech Republic) 2001 | Final | 2nd | 5 | 4 | 1 | 13 | 7 |
| (Croatia) 2003 | Final | 2nd | 5 | 4 | 1 | 12 | 9 |
| (Latvia) 2005 | Final | 1st | 5 | 5 | 0 | 15 | 6 |
| (Austria) 2007 | Final | 2nd | 5 | 3 | 2 | 12 | 8 |
| (Netherlands) 2009 | Semifinals | 4th | 5 | 3 | 2 | 12 | 9 |
| (Turkey) 2011 | Preliminary Round | 9th | 5 | 2 | 3 | 8 | 11 |
| (Bosnia and Herzegovina) (Serbia) 2013 | Final | 2nd | 7 | 6 | 1 | 19 | 3 |
| (Turkey) 2015 | Final | 1st | 4 | 3 | 1 | 11 | 4 |
| (Hungary) (Slovakia) 2017 | 5th–8th places | 5th | 7 | 5 | 2 | 17 | 9 |
| Total | 2 Titles | 12/12 | | | | | |

=== U18 European Championship ===
Champions Runners up Third place

U18 European Championship record
| Year | Round | Position | GP | MW | ML | SW | SL |
|---|---|---|---|---|---|---|---|
| (Czech Republic) (Slovakia) 2018 | Did not qualify | | | | | | |
| (Italy) 2020 | Semifinals | 3rd | 5 | 4 | 1 | 14 | 4 |
| (Georgia (country)) 2022 | 5th–8th places | 8th | 7 | 3 | 4 | 13 | 14 |
| (Bulgaria) 2024 | Semifinals | 3rd | 9 | 7 | 2 | 23 | 10 |
| (Italy) 2026 | Final | 1st | 9 | 9 | 0 | 27 | 5 |
| Total | 1 Title | 4/5 | | | | | |

=== European Youth Olympic Festival ===
- 2003 Paris – (gold) Gold medal
- 2009 Tampere – (gold) Gold medal
- 2013 Utrecht – (silver) Silver medal
- 2015 Tbilisi – (gold) Gold medal
- 2017 Győr — 7th place

== See also ==
- Poland men's national U21 volleyball team
- Poland men's national U23 volleyball team
- Poland men's national volleyball team
