= Hungary men's national under-19 volleyball team =

Youth volleyball team representing Hungary

Hungary Boys' U19
- Association: Hungarian Volleyball Federation
- Confederation: CEV

Uniforms
Home	Away	Third

Youth Olympic Games
- Appearances: No Appearances

FIVB U19 World Championship
- Appearances: No Appearances

Europe U19 / U18 Championship
- Appearances: 2 (First in 2009)
- Best result: 10th place : (2017)
- Hungarian Volleyball Federation

The Hungary men's national under-19 volleyball team represents Hungary in international men's volleyball competitions and friendly matches under the age 19 and it is ruled by the Hungarian Volleyball Federation body that is an affiliate of the Federation of International Volleyball FIVB and also part of the European Volleyball Confederation CEV.

== Results ==
=== Summer Youth Olympics ===
Champions Runners up Third place Fourth place

Youth Olympic Games
Year	Round	Position	Pld	W	L	SW	SL	Squad
(Singapore) 2010	Didn't qualify							
(China) 2014	No Volleyball Event							
(Argentina) 2018	No Volleyball Event							
Total	0 Titles	0/1						

=== FIVB U19 World Championship ===
Champions Runners up Third place Fourth place

FIVB U19 World Championship
Year	Round	Position	Pld	W	L	SW	SL	Squad
(United Arab Emirates) 1989	Didn't qualify							
(Portugal) 1991	Didn't qualify							
(Turkey) 1993	Didn't qualify							
(Puerto Rico) 1995	Didn't qualify							
(Iran) 1997	Didn't qualify							
(Saudi Arabia) 1999	Didn't qualify							
(Egypt) 2001	Didn't qualify							
(Thailand) 2003	Didn't qualify							
(Algeria) 2005	Didn't qualify							
(Mexico) 2007	Didn't qualify							
(Italy) 2009	Didn't qualify							
(Argentina) 2011	Didn't qualify							
(Mexico) 2013	Didn't qualify							
(Argentina) 2015	Didn't qualify							
(Bahrain) 2017	Didn't qualify							
(Tunisia) 2019	Didn't qualify							
(Iran) 2021	Didn't qualify							
(Argentina) 2023	Didn't qualify							
(Uzbekistan) 2025	Didn't qualify							
Total	0 Titles	0/19						

=== Europe U19 / U18 Championship ===
Champions Runners up Third place Fourth place

Europe U19 / U18 Championship
Year	Round	Position	Pld	W	L	SW	SL	Squad
(Spain) 1995	Didn't qualify							
(Slovakia) 1997	Didn't qualify							
(Poland) 1999	Didn't qualify							
(Czech Republic) 2001	Didn't qualify							
(Croatia) 2003	Didn't qualify							
(Latvia) 2005	Didn't qualify							
(Austria) 2007	Didn't qualify							
(Netherlands) 2009		11th place						
(Turkey) 2011	Didn't qualify							
(Bosnia and Herzegovina) / (Serbia) 2013	Didn't qualify							
(Turkey) 2015	Didn't qualify							
(Hungary) / (Slovakia) 2017		10th place						
(Czech Republic) / (Slovakia) 2018	Didn't qualify							
(Italy) 2020	Didn't qualify							
(Georgia (country)) 2022	Didn't qualify							
(Bulgaria) 2024	Didn't qualify							
(Italy) 2026	Didn't qualify							
Total	0 Titles	2/17						

== Team ==
=== Current squad ===
The following players are the Hungarian players that have competed in the 2018 Boys' U18 Volleyball European Championship

#	name	position	height	weight	birthday	spike	block
1	laczi dominik	outside-spiker	188	71	2001	306	297
2	flachner kornél	middle-blocker	195	89	2001	312	303
3	sárközi kálmán	libero	170	60	2001	285	275
4	csendes csaba	middle-blocker	190	83	2002	330	320
5	boa szabolcs	outside-spiker	188	85	2001	325	300
6	csordás barnabás	outside-spiker	183	79	2001	334	303
7	oláh józsef dominik	libero	176	64	2002	310	287
8	iván bence	opposite	197	82	2001	321	310
9	soyvural kevin	setter	174	71	2001	298	280
12	tajti olivér	opposite	187	71	2001	302	280
13	matyiák árpád	opposite	192	80	2001	332	312
14	iván gergo	setter	185	70	2002	308	300
16	tomanóczy bálint	middle-blocker	203	91	2001	325	305
20	szabó vilmos	outside-spiker	185	327	2002	327	315
