= Switzerland men's national under-19 volleyball team =

Switzerland Boys' U19
- Association: Swiss Volleyball Federation
- Confederation: CEV

Uniforms
Home	Away	Third

Youth Olympic Games
- Appearances: No Appearances

FIVB U19 World Championship
- Appearances: No Appearances

Europe U19 / U18 Championship
- Appearances: No Appearances
- www.volleyball.ch/ (in German)

The Switzerland men's national under-19 volleyball team represents Switzerland in international men's volleyball competitions and friendly matches under the age 19 and it is ruled by the Swiss Volleyball Federation body that is an affiliate of the Federation of International Volleyball FIVB and also part of the European Volleyball Confederation CEV.

== Results ==
=== Summer Youth Olympics ===
Champions Runners up Third place Fourth place

Youth Olympic Games
Year	Round	Position	Pld	W	L	SW	SL	Squad
(Singapore) 2010	Didn't qualify							
(China) 2014	No Volleyball Event							
(Argentina) 2018	No Volleyball Event							
Total	0 Titles	0/1						

=== FIVB U19 World Championship ===
Champions Runners up Third place Fourth place

FIVB U19 World Championship
Year	Round	Position	Pld	W	L	SW	SL	Squad
(United Arab Emirates) 1989	Didn't qualify							
(Portugal) 1991	Didn't qualify							
(Turkey) 1993	Didn't qualify							
(Puerto Rico) 1995	Didn't qualify							
(Iran) 1997	Didn't qualify							
(Saudi Arabia) 1999	Didn't qualify							
(Egypt) 2001	Didn't qualify							
(Thailand) 2003	Didn't qualify							
(Algeria) 2005	Didn't qualify							
(Mexico) 2007	Didn't qualify							
(Italy) 2009	Didn't qualify							
(Argentina) 2011	Didn't qualify							
(Mexico) 2013	Didn't qualify							
(Argentina) 2015	Didn't qualify							
(Bahrain) 2017	Didn't qualify							
(Tunisia) 2019	Didn't qualify							
Total	0 Titles	0/16						

=== Europe U19 / U18 Championship ===
Champions Runners up Third place Fourth place

Europe U19 / U18 Championship
Year	Round	Position	Pld	W	L	SW	SL	Squad
(Spain) 1995	Didn't qualify							
(Slovakia) 1997	Didn't qualify							
(Poland) 1999	Didn't qualify							
(Czech Republic) 2001	Didn't qualify							
(Croatia) 2003	Didn't qualify							
(Latvia) 2005	Didn't qualify							
(Austria) 2007	Didn't qualify							
(Netherlands) 2009	Didn't qualify							
(Turkey) 2011	Didn't qualify							
(Bosnia and Herzegovina) / (Serbia) 2013	Didn't qualify							
(Turkey) 2015	Didn't qualify							
(Hungary) / (Slovakia) 2017	Didn't qualify							
(Czech Republic) / (Slovakia) 2018	Didn't qualify							
Total	0 Titles	0/13						

== Team ==
=== Current squad ===
The following players are the Swiss players that have competed in the 2018 Boys' U18 Volleyball European Championship

#	name	position	height	weight	birthday	spike	block
1	schnegg tinko	libero	184	64	2001	316	296
2	margot simon	middle-blocker	195	73	2001	324	304
2	rehn lorin	outside-spiker	185	65	2001	318	298
3	lengweiler alexander	middle-blocker	195	71	2001	330	310
4	conconi silvano	outside-spiker	186	66	2001	324	305
5	smit tijs	outside-spiker	184	78	2001	322	300
6	waldvogel adrien	middle-blocker	187	75	2002	310	294
7	schmid roy	middle-blocker	188	68	2002	304	290
8	becker-burgos matias	opposite	196	67	2001	314	300
9	moser tobias	setter	186	67	2001	320	300
11	dillier leo	setter	190	83	2001	326	306
12	mladenovic darko	outside-spiker	188	79	2001	314	294
13	sütterlin flavio	opposite	195	72	2001	320	300
14	borrello luca	middle-blocker	187	80	2002	314	295
15	ineichen tim	libero	180	67	2001	302	282
16	colomb thibaud	outside-spiker	193	78	2002	318	300
17	haarpaintner thibaud	outside-spiker	186	64	2001	318	300
18	omokhuale davison	middle-blocker	189	88	2002	318	300
19	mueller romain	libero	180	66	2003	308	290
20	leray emmanuel	middle-blocker	188	83	2002	306	290
21	nicoli simone	setter	186	69	2001	304	284
