= Sweden men's national under-19 volleyball team =

Youth volleyball team representing Sweden

Sweden Boys' U19
- Association: Swedish Volleyball Federation
- Confederation: CEV

Uniforms
Home	Away	Third

Youth Olympic Games
- Appearances: No Appearances

FIVB U19 World Championship
- Appearances: No Appearances

Europe U19 / U18 Championship
- Appearances: No Appearances
- www.volleyboll.se

The Sweden men's national under-19 volleyball team represents Sweden in international men's volleyball competitions and friendly matches under the age 19 and it is ruled by the Swedish Volleyball Federation body that is an affiliate of the Federation of International Volleyball FIVB and also part of the European Volleyball Confederation CEV.

== Results ==
=== Summer Youth Olympics ===
Champions Runners up Third place Fourth place

Youth Olympic Games
Year	Round	Position	Pld	W	L	SW	SL	Squad
(Singapore) 2010	Didn't qualify							
(China) 2014	No Volleyball Event							
(Argentina) 2018	No Volleyball Event							
Total	0 Titles	0/1						

=== FIVB U19 World Championship ===
Champions Runners up Third place Fourth place

FIVB U19 World Championship
Year	Round	Position	Pld	W	L	SW	SL	Squad
(United Arab Emirates) 1989	Didn't qualify							
(Portugal) 1991	Didn't qualify							
(Turkey) 1993	Didn't qualify							
(Puerto Rico) 1995	Didn't qualify							
(Iran) 1997	Didn't qualify							
(Saudi Arabia) 1999	Didn't qualify							
(Egypt) 2001	Didn't qualify							
(Thailand) 2003	Didn't qualify							
(Algeria) 2005	Didn't qualify							
(Mexico) 2007	Didn't qualify							
(Italy) 2009	Didn't qualify							
(Argentina) 2011	Didn't qualify							
(Mexico) 2013	Didn't qualify							
(Argentina) 2015	Didn't qualify							
(Bahrain) 2017	Didn't qualify							
(Tunisia) 2019	Didn't qualify							
Total	0 Titles	0/16						

=== Europe U19 / U18 Championship ===
Champions Runners up Third place Fourth place

Europe U19 / U18 Championship
Year	Round	Position	Pld	W	L	SW	SL	Squad
(Spain) 1995	Didn't qualify							
(Slovakia) 1997	Didn't qualify							
(Poland) 1999	Didn't qualify							
(Czech Republic) 2001	Didn't qualify							
(Croatia) 2003	Didn't qualify							
(Latvia) 2005	Didn't qualify							
(Austria) 2007	Didn't qualify							
(Netherlands) 2009	Didn't qualify							
(Turkey) 2011	Didn't qualify							
(Bosnia and Herzegovina) / (Serbia) 2013	Didn't qualify							
(Turkey) 2015	Didn't qualify							
(Hungary) / (Slovakia) 2017	Didn't qualify							
(Czech Republic) / (Slovakia) 2018	Didn't qualify							
Total	0 Titles	0/13						

== Team ==
=== Current squad ===
The following players are the Swedish players that have competed in the 2018 Boys' U18 Volleyball European Championship

#	name	position	height	weight	birthday	spike	block
	Åhman david	outside-spiker	189	72	2001	339	330
	Andersson einar	middle-blocker	196	81	2001	331	322
	Borna emil	outside-spiker	187	69	2002	312	306
	Borna max	libero	180	63	2002	298	290
	Bosrup petter	libero	178	68	2001	302	290
	Bratic filip	setter	181	67	2001	309	305
	Ekholm fredrik	libero	177	71	2001	307	299
	Ekstrand hampus	outside-spiker	185	68	2003	312	301
	Fredstam pontus	setter	176	65	2001	305	296
	Grahn theodor	middle-blocker	192	76	2003	317	308
	Gustafsson albin	outside-spiker	188	85	2001	315	310
	Hedman robin	middle-blocker	193	77	2002	327	320
	Hellvig jonatan	outside-spiker	192	74	2001	335	325
	Johansson tim	middle-blocker	194	81	2001	325	315
	Molin gustav	outside-spiker	182	72	2001	315	307
	Morency hugo	libero	174	63	2003	306	293
	Nilsson linus	middle-blocker	198	89	2001	335	322
	Petersson max	outside-spiker	192	87	2001	325	315
	Pihl sebastian	outside-spiker	182	65	2001	315	304
	Tevérus oskar	opposite	183	76	2001	315	306
