= Netherlands men's national under-19 volleyball team =

The Netherlands Boys' U19
- Association: The Dutch Volleyball Federation
- Confederation: CEV

Uniforms
Home	Away	Third

Youth Olympic Games
- Appearances: No Appearances

FIVB U19 World Championship
- Appearances: 1 (First in 2003)
- Best result: 9th place :(2003)

Europe U19 / U18 Championship
- Appearances: 4 (First in 2003)
- Best result: 5th place : (2003)
- www.volleybal.nl (in Dutch)

The Netherlands men's national under-19 volleyball team represents Netherlands in international men's volleyball competitions and friendly matches under the age 19 and it is ruled by the Dutch Volleyball Federation body that is an affiliate of the Federation of International Volleyball FIVB and also part of the European Volleyball Confederation CEV.

== Results ==
=== Summer Youth Olympics ===
Champions Runners up Third place Fourth place

Youth Olympic Games
Year	Round	Position	Pld	W	L	SW	SL	Squad
(Singapore) 2010	Didn't Qualify							
(China) 2014	No Volleyball Event							
(Argentina) 2018	No Volleyball Event							
Total	0 Titles	0/1						

=== FIVB U19 World Championship ===
Champions Runners up Third place Fourth place

FIVB U19 World Championship
Year	Round	Position	Pld	W	L	SW	SL	Squad
(United Arab Emirates) 1989	Didn't qualify							
(Portugal) 1991	Didn't qualify							
(Turkey) 1993	Didn't qualify							
(Puerto Rico) 1995	Didn't qualify							
(Iran) 1997	Didn't qualify							
(Saudi Arabia) 1999	Didn't qualify							
(Egypt) 2001	Didn't qualify							
(Thailand) 2003		9th place						
(Algeria) 2005	Didn't qualify							
(Mexico) 2007	Didn't qualify							
(Italy) 2009	Didn't qualify							
(Argentina) 2011	Didn't qualify							
(Mexico) 2013	Didn't qualify							
(Argentina) 2015	Didn't qualify							
(Bahrain) 2017	Didn't qualify							
(Tunisia) 2019	Didn't qualify							
(Iran) 2021	Didn't qualify							
(Argentina) 2023	Didn't qualify							
(Uzbekistan) 2025	Didn't qualify							
Total	0 Titles	1/19						

=== Europe U19 / U18 Championship ===
Champions Runners up Third place Fourth place

Europe U19 / U18 Championship
Year	Round	Position	Pld	W	L	SW	SL	Squad
(Spain) 1995	Didn't qualify							
(Slovakia) 1997	Didn't qualify							
(Poland) 1999	Didn't qualify							
(Czech Republic) 2001	Didn't qualify							
(Croatia) 2003		5th place						
(Latvia) 2005	Didn't qualify							
(Austria) 2007		6th place						
(Netherlands) 2009		6th place						
(Turkey) 2011	Didn't qualify							
(Bosnia and Herzegovina) / (Serbia) 2013	Didn't qualify							
(Turkey) 2015	Didn't qualify							
(Hungary) / (Slovakia) 2017	Didn't qualify							
(Czech Republic) / (Slovakia) 2018	Didn't qualify							
(Italy) 2020	Didn't qualify							
(Georgia (country)) 2022	Didn't qualify							
(Bulgaria) 2024	Didn't qualify							
(Italy) 2026		15th place						
Total	0 Titles	4/17						

== Team ==
=== Current squad ===
The following players are the Dutch players that have competed in the 2018 Boys' U18 Volleyball European Championship

#	name	position	height	weight	birthday	spike	block
1	wijkstra jasper	setter	195	78	2002	319	311
2	bak yannick	outside-spiker	194	75	2001	325	315
3	martherus nick	libero	180	65	2001	315	278
4	apine mathijs	outside-spiker	190	70	2002	340	328
5	brilhuis martijn	opposite	199	83	2001	342	332
6	macnack kian	opposite	201	72	2003	336	294
7	wiltenburg bram	middle-blocker	192	79	2001	313	307
8	hoge bavel luuk	outside-spiker	192	80	2001	324	316
9	damen rik	setter	193	78	2001	325	315
10	van muijden jesper	middle-blocker	198	93	2001	328	319
11	hofhuis luuk	middle-blocker	199	92	2001	333	323
12	de jong tieme	setter	193	80	2001	321	308
13	koetse morris	outside-spiker	198	70	2002	342	329
14	steenbergen jim	outside-spiker	192	82	2001	319	308
15	van den bos steijn	middle-blocker	191	79	2001	312	298
16	van dijk ferdy	libero	188	70	2001	312	306
17	merfol delano	outside-spiker	190	75	2001	305	295
18	buiter friso	outside-spiker	184	72	2001	310	305
19	ooijman siem	outside-spiker	190	70	2003	299	283
19	van der loo sam	outside-spiker	184	75	2001	310	305
19	zomer bart	opposite	190	70	2002	300	305
20	so vincent	outside-spiker	180	57	2003	302	290
22	de ruijter stijn	outside-spiker	195	91	2003	308	293
