= Serbia men's national under-19 volleyball team =

Serbia Boys' U19
- Association: Volleyball Federation of Serbia
- Confederation: CEV

Uniforms
Home	Away	Third

Youth Olympic Games
- Appearances: No Appearances

FIVB U19 World Championship
- Appearances: 3 (First in 2009)
- Best result: (gold) Champions : (2009, 2011)

Europe U19 / U18 Championship
- Appearances: 7 (First in 2005)
- Best result: (gold) Champions : (2011)
- Official website (in Serbian)

The Serbia men's national under-19 volleyball team represents Serbia in international men's volleyball competitions and friendly matches under the age 19 and it is ruled by the Volleyball Federation of Serbia body that is an affiliate of the Federation of International Volleyball FIVB and also part of the European Volleyball Confederation CEV.

== Results ==
=== Summer Youth Olympics ===
Champions Runners up Third place Fourth place

Youth Olympic Games
Year	Round	Position	Pld	W	L	SW	SL	Squad
(Singapore) 2010	Didn't qualify							
(China) 2014	No Volleyball Event							
(Argentina) 2018	No Volleyball Event							
Total	0 Titles	0/1						

=== FIVB U19 World Championship ===
Champions Runners up Third place Fourth place

FIVB U19 World Championship
Year	Round	Position	Pld	W	L	SW	SL	Squad
(United Arab Emirates) 1989	Didn't qualify							
(Portugal) 1991	Didn't qualify							
(Turkey) 1993	Didn't qualify							
(Puerto Rico) 1995	Didn't qualify							
(Iran) 1997	Didn't qualify							
(Saudi Arabia) 1999	Didn't qualify							
(Egypt) 2001	Didn't qualify							
(Thailand) 2003	Didn't qualify							
(Algeria) 2005	Didn't qualify							
(Mexico) 2007	Didn't qualify							
(Italy) 2009		Champions						
(Argentina) 2011		Champions						
(Mexico) 2013	Didn't qualify							
(Argentina) 2015	Didn't qualify							
(Bahrain) 2017	Didn't qualify							
(Tunisia) 2019	Didn't qualify							
(Iran) 2021	Didn't qualify							
(Argentina) 2023		15th						
(Uzbekistan) 2025	Didn't qualify							
Total	2 Titles	3/19						

=== Europe U19 / U18 Championship ===
Champions Runners up Third place Fourth place

Europe U19 / U18 Championship
Year	Round	Position	Pld	W	L	SW	SL	Squad
(Spain) 1995	Didn't qualify							
(Slovakia) 1997	Didn't qualify							
(Poland) 1999	Didn't qualify							
(Czech Republic) 2001	Didn't qualify							
(Croatia) 2003	Didn't qualify							
(Latvia) 2005		8th place						
(Austria) 2007		7th place						
(Netherlands) 2009		Runners-up						
(Turkey) 2011		Champions						
(Bosnia and Herzegovina) / (Serbia) 2013		11th place						
(Turkey) 2015		8th place						
(Hungary) / (Slovakia) 2017	Didn't qualify							
(Czech Republic) / (Slovakia) 2018	Didn't qualify							
(Italy) 2020	Didn't qualify							
(Georgia (country)) 2022		4th place						
(Bulgaria) 2024	Didn't qualify							
(Italy) 2026		12th place						
Total	1 Title	7/17						

== Team ==
=== Current squad ===
The following players are the Serbs players that have competed in the 2018 Boys' U18 Volleyball European Championship

#	name	position	height	weight	birthday	spike	block
	Bekric alija	outside-spiker	187	68	2001	314	296
	Blagojevic luka	opposite	189	70	2001	314	300
	Bojovic milos	middle-blocker	195	80	2001	317	307
	Djordjic uros	middle-blocker	195	77	2002	318	309
	Fet stefan	middle-blocker	191	61	2001	319	301
	Jevtovic bojan	setter	189	68	2001	309	297
	Jezdimirovic milos	setter	184	64	2001	305	293
	Maksimovic nemanja	libero	175	65	2002	295	285
	Malesevic uros	middle-blocker	196	67	2001	317	301
	Mandic dusan	outside-spiker	185	63	2001	310	296
	Markovic milos	opposite	192	77	2001	317	304
	Micic nikola	setter	183	70	2001	307	290
	Mijailovic milutin	outside-spiker	184	79	2002	310	293
	Milenkovic marko	libero	175	59	2001	285	270
	Misic nikola	outside-spiker	189	75	2001	319	302
	Mladenovic aleksa	libero	189	75	2001	305	290
	Niketic ognjen	outside-spiker	189	76	2001	318	302
	Popic milos	middle-blocker	191	69	2001	312	293
	Ruzic stevan	middle-blocker	194	79	2001	320	306
	Stankovic dimitrije	middle-blocker	199	68	2001	319	307
	Stanojevic bogdan	setter	190	80	2001	312	296
	Stepanovic jovan	outside-spiker	194	77	2001	321	304
	Vidovic ognjen	opposite	190	68	2002	317	300
	Zaric aleksandar	opposite	191	80	2001	323	304
	Zivic aleksa	outside-spiker	190	63	2001	315	300
