= Belgium men's national under-19 volleyball team =

Belgium Boys' U19
- Association: Belgium Volleyball Federation
- Confederation: CEV

Uniforms
Home	Away	Third

Youth Olympic Games
- Appearances: No Appearances

FIVB U19 World Championship
- Appearances: 6 (First in 2007)
- Best result: 6th place : (2007, 2023)

Europe U19 / U18 Championship
- Appearances: 10 (First in 2007)
- Best result: (bronze) Third place : (2007, 2013)
- Official KBVBV website (in Dutch)

The Belgium men's national under-19 volleyball team represents Belgium in international men's volleyball competitions and friendly matches under the age 19 and it is ruled by the Royal Belgium Volleyball Federation body that is an affiliate of the Federation of International Volleyball FIVB and also part of the European Volleyball Confederation CEV.

== Results ==
=== Summer Youth Olympics ===
Champions Runners up Third place Fourth place

Youth Olympic Games
Year	Round	Position	Pld	W	L	SW	SL	Squad
(Singapore) 2010	Didn't qualify							
(China) 2014	No Volleyball Event							
(Argentina) 2018	No Volleyball Event							
Total	0 Titles	0/1						

=== FIVB U19 World Championship ===
Champions Runners up Third place Fourth place

FIVB U19 World Championship
Year	Round	Position	Pld	W	L	SW	SL	Squad
(United Arab Emirates) 1989	Didn't qualify							
(Portugal) 1991	Didn't qualify							
(Turkey) 1993	Didn't qualify							
(Puerto Rico) 1995	Didn't qualify							
(Iran) 1997	Didn't qualify							
(Saudi Arabia) 1999	Didn't qualify							
(Egypt) 2001	Didn't qualify							
(Thailand) 2003	Didn't qualify							
(Algeria) 2005	Didn't qualify							
(Mexico) 2007		6th place						
(Italy) 2009	Didn't qualify							
(Argentina) 2011	Didn't qualify							
(Mexico) 2013		9th place						
(Argentina) 2015		17th place						Squad
(Bahrain) 2017	Didn't qualify							
(Tunisia) 2019	Didn't qualify							
(Iran) 2021		11th place						
(Argentina) 2023		6th place						
(Uzbekistan) 2025		11th place						
Total	0 Titles	6/19						

=== Europe U19 / U18 Championship ===
Champions Runners up Third place Fourth place

Europe U19 / U18 Championship
Year	Round	Position	Pld	W	L	SW	SL	Squad
(Spain) 1995	Didn't qualify							
(Slovakia) 1997	Didn't qualify							
(Poland) 1999	Didn't qualify							
(Czech Republic) 2001	Didn't qualify							
(Croatia) 2003	Didn't qualify							
(Latvia) 2005	Didn't qualify							
(Austria) 2007		Third place						
(Netherlands) 2009		7th place						
(Turkey) 2011		7th place						
(Bosnia and Herzegovina) / (Serbia) 2013		Third place						
(Turkey) 2015	Didn't qualify							
(Hungary) / (Slovakia) 2017		7th place						
(Czech Republic) / (Slovakia) 2018		7th place						
(Italy) 2020		6th place						
(Georgia (country)) 2022		6th place						
(Bulgaria) 2024		6th place						
(Italy) 2026		11th place						
Total	0 Titles	10/17						

== Team ==
=== Current squad ===
The following players are the Belgian players that have competed in the 2018 Boys' U18 Volleyball European Championship

#	name	position	height	weight	birthday	spike	block
	Beelaert Lennert	outside-spiker	185	56	2003	282	308
	Catteeuw Seppe	opposite	186	73	2001	330	306
	Coopmans Bart	middle-blocker	198	86	2002	297	311
	d'Heer Wout	opposite	202	81	2001	340	319
	de Saedeleer Daan	middle-blocker	191	76	2001	327	311
	Drent Robin	middle-blocker	194	77	2002	327	310
	Fafchamps Samuel	middle-blocker	196	77	2001	323	299
	Fransen Michiel	outside-spiker	196	82	2002	321	301
	Geudens Rob	middle-blocker	198	76	2001	330	305
	Hooft Niels	opposite	193	75	2001	310	290
	Mandervelt Michiel	opposite	191	77	2002	296	313
	Mc Cluskey Liam	setter	187	90	2002	313	294
	Ocket Thiemen	setter	184	73	2002	311	288
	Peeters Antoon	outside-spiker	187	77	2002	317	298
	Peeters Joost	outside-spiker	187	87	2001	318	293
	Perin Martin	libero	185	68	2002	289	284
	Peters Sibren	libero	178	66	2003	306	282
	Plaskie Simon	outside-spiker	190	77	2001	333	313
	Rotty Seppe	outside-spiker	187	74	2001	333	312
	Trochs Ruben	outside-spiker	188	80	2002	320	295
	van de Velde Robbe	outside-spiker	194	77	2002	319	302
	van Elsen Lennert	middle-blocker	201	79	2001	325	336
	van Loke Nick	setter	181	67	2001	305	300
	Vanhelmont Romain	middle-blocker	194	84	2001	328	308
	Vanhove Wandglin	opposite	180	66	2002	318	302
	Verbruggen Joran	libero	180	71	2001	313	289
