= Slovenia men's national under-19 volleyball team =

Slovenia U19
- Association: Volleyball Federation of Slovenia
- Confederation: CEV

Uniforms
Home	Away	Third

Youth Olympic Games
- Appearances: No Appearances

FIVB U19 World Championship
- Appearances: 1 (First in 2023)
- Best result: 10th place : (2023)

Europe U19 / U18 Championship
- Appearances: 6 (First in 2001)
- Best result: 5th place : (2022)
- www.odbojka.si (in Slovene)

The Slovenia men's national under-19 volleyball team represents Slovenia in international men's volleyball competitions under the age of 19 and is controlled by the Volleyball Federation of Slovenia, which is an affiliate of the Federation of International Volleyball (FIVB) and also a part of the European Volleyball Confederation (CEV).

== Results ==
=== Summer Youth Olympics ===
Champions Runners up Third place Fourth place

Youth Olympic Games
Year	Round	Position	Pld	W	L	SW	SL	Squad
(Singapore) 2010	Didn't qualify							
(China) 2014	No Volleyball Event							
(Argentina) 2018	No Volleyball Event							
Total	0 Titles	0/1						

=== FIVB U19 World Championship ===
Champions Runners up Third place Fourth place

FIVB U19 World Championship
Year	Round	Position	Pld	W	L	SW	SL	Squad
(United Arab Emirates) 1989	Didn't qualify							
(Portugal) 1991	Didn't qualify							
(Turkey) 1993	Didn't qualify							
(Puerto Rico) 1995	Didn't qualify							
(Iran) 1997	Didn't qualify							
(Saudi Arabia) 1999	Didn't qualify							
(Egypt) 2001	Didn't qualify							
(Thailand) 2003	Didn't qualify							
(Algeria) 2005	Didn't qualify							
(Mexico) 2007	Didn't qualify							
(Italy) 2009	Didn't qualify							
(Argentina) 2011	Didn't qualify							
(Mexico) 2013	Didn't qualify							
(Argentina) 2015	Didn't qualify							
(Bahrain) 2017	Didn't qualify							
(Tunisia) 2019	Didn't qualify							
(Argentina) 2023		10th place						
(Uzbekistan) 2025	Didn't qualify							
Total	0 Titles	1/19						

=== Europe U19 / U18 Championship ===
Champions Runners up Third place Fourth place

Europe U19 / U18 Championship
Year	Round	Position	Pld	W	L	SW	SL	Squad
(Spain) 1995	Didn't qualify							
(Slovakia) 1997	Didn't qualify							
(Poland) 1999	Didn't qualify							
(Czech Republic) 2001		8th place						
(Croatia) 2003	Didn't qualify							
(Latvia) 2005		7th place						
(Austria) 2007	Didn't qualify							
(Netherlands) 2009	Didn't qualify							
(Turkey) 2011	Didn't qualify							
(Bosnia and Herzegovina) / (Serbia) 2013		9th place						
(Turkey) 2015	Didn't qualify							
(Hungary) / (Slovakia) 2017	Didn't qualify							
(Czech Republic) / (Slovakia) 2018	Didn't qualify							
(Italy) 2020	Didn't qualify							
(Georgia (country)) 2022		5th place						
(Bulgaria) 2024		8th place						
(Italy) 2026		5th place						
Total	0 Titles	6/17						

== Team ==
=== Current squad ===
The following players are the Slovenian players that have competed in the 2018 Boys' U18 Volleyball European Championship

#	name	position	height	weight	birthday	spike	block
1	šen klemen	outside-spiker	188	75	2002	333	315
2	košir jakob	middle-blocker	193	80	2001	329	313
3	marovt anže	setter	181	72	2001	313	287
4	hafner urban	setter	179	60	2001	313	280
5	novak david	libero	181	68	2002	312	287
6	ibrišimovic gal	outside-spiker	188	75	2001	320	305
7	rozman crt	outside-spiker	187	66	2002	325	295
8	travnik toni	outside-spiker	184	73	2002	328	313
9	možic rok	outside-spiker	191	72	2002	335	310
10	udrih jaka	outside-spiker	182	71	2001	312	286
11	bracko rok	libero	183	70	2004	313	282
12	glinšek kaj	middle-blocker	196	86	2002	339	320
13	stožir luka	opposite	187	75	2002	336	321
14	herodež kristjan	middle-blocker	193	82	2001	335	318
16	založnik tilen	outside-spiker	189	78	2001	333	315
17	legan tim	middle-blocker	196	85	2001	324	312
18	leva filip	middle-blocker	190	79	2001	326	310
	Fužir urban	libero	181	72	2002	309	288
	Ramšak vid	setter	190	78	2001	322	300
