= 2013 Boys' Youth European Volleyball Championship squads =

This article shows all participating team squads at the 2013 Boys' Youth European Volleyball Championship, held in Serbia and Bosnia and Herzegovina from 12–21 April 2013.

== Austria ==
The following is the Austria roster in the 2013 Boys' Youth European Volleyball Championship.

Head coach: Nina Sawatzki

No.	Name	Date of birth	Height	Weight	Spike	Block	Position
3	Florian Ertl	21 January 1995	1.90 m (6 ft 3 in)	78 kg (172 lb)	320 cm (130 in)	302 cm (119 in)	setter
4	Niklas Steiner	10 February 1995	1.82 m (6 ft 0 in)	73 kg (161 lb)	320 cm (130 in)	304 cm (120 in)	outside hitter
5	Stefan Mayerhofer	15 May 1995	1.93 m (6 ft 4 in)	72 kg (159 lb)	325 cm (128 in)	310 cm (120 in)	middle blocker
6	David Michel	27 October 1996	1.90 m (6 ft 3 in)	74 kg (163 lb)	323 cm (127 in)	306 cm (120 in)	opposite
7	Fabian Kriener	31 December 1995	1.93 m (6 ft 4 in)	85 kg (187 lb)	333 cm (131 in)	310 cm (120 in)	setter
9	Kemal Imsirovic	16 September 1995	1.96 m (6 ft 5 in)	86 kg (190 lb)	320 cm (130 in)	306 cm (120 in)	middle blocker
10	Daniel Egger	17 May 1996	1.98 m (6 ft 6 in)	85 kg (187 lb)	338 cm (133 in)	314 cm (124 in)	outside hitter
11	Daniel Meissner	7 May 1995	1.87 m (6 ft 2 in)	77 kg (170 lb)	322 cm (127 in)	305 cm (120 in)	libero
12	Niklas Maurer	9 September 1995	1.74 m (5 ft 9 in)	74 kg (163 lb)	305 cm (120 in)	293 cm (115 in)	libero
13	Lukas Scheucher	16 December 1996	1.93 m (6 ft 4 in)	73 kg (161 lb)	328 cm (129 in)	310 cm (120 in)	middle blocker
16	Philipp Waller	26 September 1995	1.87 m (6 ft 2 in)	75 kg (165 lb)	321 cm (126 in)	305 cm (120 in)	outside hitter
18	Paul Buchegger	4 March 1996	2.04 m (6 ft 8 in)	91 kg (201 lb)	335 cm (132 in)	320 cm (130 in)	opposite

== Belgium ==
The following is the Belgium roster in the 2013 Boys' Youth European Volleyball Championship.

Head coach: Steven Vanmedegael

No.	Name	Date of birth	Height	Weight	Spike	Block	Position
2	Sander Depowere	8 January 1995	1.96 m (6 ft 5 in)	80 kg (180 lb)	331 cm (130 in)	305 cm (120 in)	setter
4	Laszlo De Paepe	24 June 1996	2.01 m (6 ft 7 in)	91 kg (201 lb)	351 cm (138 in)	320 cm (130 in)	middle blocker
5	Jelle Decoene	11 February 1995	1.89 m (6 ft 2 in)	76 kg (168 lb)	331 cm (130 in)	299 cm (118 in)	middle blocker
6	Thomas Bisaerts	2 August 1996	1.87 m (6 ft 2 in)	77 kg (170 lb)	326 cm (128 in)	300 cm (120 in)	libero
7	Michiel Thijs	24 September 1995	1.83 m (6 ft 0 in)	67 kg (148 lb)	317 cm (125 in)	284 cm (112 in)	libero
8	Arno Van De Velde	30 December 1995	2.08 m (6 ft 10 in)	96 kg (212 lb)	347 cm (137 in)	320 cm (130 in)	middle blocker
9	Lowie Stuer	24 November 1995	1.94 m (6 ft 4 in)	81 kg (179 lb)	333 cm (131 in)	306 cm (120 in)	outside hitter
10	Jonas Colson	8 March 1995	1.91 m (6 ft 3 in)	78 kg (172 lb)	332 cm (131 in)	305 cm (120 in)	outside hitter
11	Thomas Konings	7 March 1997	2.00 m (6 ft 7 in)	90 kg (200 lb)	352 cm (139 in)	318 cm (125 in)	opposite
12	Robbe Vandeweyer	6 July 1995	1.98 m (6 ft 6 in)	94 kg (207 lb)	340 cm (130 in)	311 cm (122 in)	opposite
13	Florian Malisse	14 December 1997	1.90 m (6 ft 3 in)	79 kg (174 lb)	335 cm (132 in)	305 cm (120 in)	setter
14	Gilles Vandecaveye	28 August 1995	1.92 m (6 ft 4 in)	80 kg (180 lb)	335 cm (132 in)	305 cm (120 in)	outside hitter

== Bosnia and Herzegovina ==
The following is the Bosnia and Herzegovina roster in the 2013 Boys' Youth European Volleyball Championship.

== Bulgaria ==
The following is the Bulgaria roster in the 2013 Boys' Youth European Volleyball Championship.

== Finland ==
The following is the Finland roster in the 2013 Boys' Youth European Volleyball Championship.

== France ==
The following is the France roster in the 2013 Boys' Youth European Volleyball Championship.

== Italy ==
The following is the Italy roster in the 2013 Boys' Youth European Volleyball Championship.

Head coach: Andrea Tomasini

No.	Name	Date of birth	Height	Weight	Spike	Block	Position
1	Alberto Polo	7 September 1995	2.00 m (6 ft 7 in)	76 kg (168 lb)	340 cm (130 in)	320 cm (130 in)	middle blocker
2	Omar Biglino	9 August 1995	1.97 m (6 ft 6 in)	86 kg (190 lb)	328 cm (129 in)	306 cm (120 in)	middle blocker
4	Alberto Bortolato	18 February 1995	1.94 m (6 ft 4 in)	99 kg (218 lb)	338 cm (133 in)	315 cm (124 in)	opposite
5	Oreste Cavuto	5 December 1996	1.92 m (6 ft 4 in)	78 kg (172 lb)	330 cm (130 in)	311 cm (122 in)	outside hitter
7	Fabio Balaso	20 October 1995	1.79 m (5 ft 10 in)	69 kg (152 lb)	317 cm (125 in)	300 cm (120 in)	libero
8	Matteo Pistolesi	14 March 1995	1.90 m (6 ft 3 in)	76 kg (168 lb)	322 cm (127 in)	304 cm (120 in)	setter
9	Simone Giannelli	9 August 1996	1.97 m (6 ft 6 in)	87 kg (192 lb)	341 cm (134 in)	323 cm (127 in)	setter
10	Tiziano Mazzone	22 July 1995	1.98 m (6 ft 6 in)	85 kg (187 lb)	336 cm (132 in)	314 cm (124 in)	outside hitter
11	Denis Alikaj	6 September 1995	1.98 m (6 ft 6 in)	90 kg (200 lb)	340 cm (130 in)	315 cm (124 in)	middle blocker
12	Riccardo Mazzon	31 January 1996	1.98 m (6 ft 6 in)	81 kg (179 lb)	341 cm (134 in)	314 cm (124 in)	outside hitter
13	Ferdinando Della Volpe	10 January 1996	1.95 m (6 ft 5 in)	73 kg (161 lb)	342 cm (135 in)	317 cm (125 in)	outside hitter
14	Sebastiano Milan	6 April 1995	2.04 m (6 ft 8 in)	83 kg (183 lb)	343 cm (135 in)	325 cm (128 in)	opposite

== Poland ==
The following is the Poland roster in the 2013 Boys' Youth European Volleyball Championship.

Head coach: Wiesław Czaja

No.	Name	Date of birth	Height	Weight	Spike	Block	Position
2	Piotr Badura	20 February 1995	2.07 m (6 ft 9 in)	85 kg (187 lb)	340 cm (130 in)	319 cm (126 in)	middle blocker
3	Bartłomiej Lemański	19 March 1996	2.08 m (6 ft 10 in)	88 kg (194 lb)	345 cm (136 in)	323 cm (127 in)	middle blocker
5	Sebastian Matula	9 April 1995	1.93 m (6 ft 4 in)	80 kg (180 lb)	330 cm (130 in)	308 cm (121 in)	setter
6	Paweł Gryc	9 January 1996	2.07 m (6 ft 9 in)	100 kg (220 lb)	348 cm (137 in)	320 cm (130 in)	outside hitter
7	Łukasz Pietrzak	25 July 1995	2.04 m (6 ft 8 in)	88 kg (194 lb)	345 cm (136 in)	319 cm (126 in)	opposite
8	Bartosz Bućko	6 January 1995	1.95 m (6 ft 5 in)	84 kg (185 lb)	337 cm (133 in)	312 cm (123 in)	outside hitter
9	Krzysztof Bieńkowski	19 June 1995	1.97 m (6 ft 6 in)	83 kg (183 lb)	338 cm (133 in)	311 cm (122 in)	setter
10	Artur Szalpuk	20 March 1995	2.00 m (6 ft 7 in)	85 kg (187 lb)	345 cm (136 in)	319 cm (126 in)	outside hitter
11	Aleksander Śliwka	24 May 1995	1.94 m (6 ft 4 in)	78 kg (172 lb)	337 cm (133 in)	321 cm (126 in)	outside hitter
12	Jan Fornal	14 January 1995	1.91 m (6 ft 3 in)	83 kg (183 lb)	345 cm (136 in)	317 cm (125 in)	outside hitter
13	Rafał Szymura	29 August 1995	1.96 m (6 ft 5 in)	88 kg (194 lb)	335 cm (132 in)	309 cm (122 in)	outside hitter
17	Kacper Piechocki	17 December 1995	1.86 m (6 ft 1 in)	75 kg (165 lb)	315 cm (124 in)	300 cm (120 in)	libero

== Russia ==
The following is the Russia roster in the 2013 Boys' Youth European Volleyball Championship.

== Serbia ==
The following is the Serbia roster in the 2013 Boys' Youth European Volleyball Championship.

== Slovenia ==
The following is the Slovenia roster in the 2013 Boys' Youth European Volleyball Championship.

== Turkey ==
The following is the Turkey roster in the 2013 Boys' Youth European Volleyball Championship.
