= Czechoslovakia men's national under-19 volleyball team =

Czechoslovakia U19
- Association: Czechoslovak Volley Federation
- Confederation: CEV

Uniforms
Home	Away	Third

Youth Olympic Games
- Appearances: No Appearances

FIVB U19 World Championship
- Appearances: 2 (First in 1989)
- Best result: 4th place : (1991)

Europe U19 / U18 Championship
- Appearances: No Appearances
- www.cvf.cz (in Czech)

The Czechoslovakia men's national under-19 volleyball team represented Czechoslovakia in international men's volleyball competitions and friendly matches under the age of 19 and it was ruled by the Czechoslovak Volleyball Federation which was a member of the Federation of International Volleyball (FIVB) and also a part of European Volleyball Confederation (CEV).

== Results ==
=== FIVB U19 World Championship ===
Champions Runners up Third place Fourth place

FIVB U19 World Championship
Year	Round	Position	Pld	W	L	SW	SL	Squad
(United Arab Emirates) 1989		9th place						Squad
(Portugal) 1991		4th Place						Squad
Total	0 Titles	2/2						

The Czechoslovakia men's national under-19 volleyball team did not compete in any European youth Championship because the team was dissolved in late 1992 before the first European youth championship took place in 1995.
