= Viktor Poletaev =

Russian volleyball player (born 1995)

Personal information
- Full name: Viktor Evgenyevich Poletaev
- Nationality: (Russia) Russian
- Born: 27 July 1995 (age 31); Chelyabinsk, Russia
- Height: 1.97 m (6 ft 6 in)
- Weight: 86 kg (190 lb)
- Spike: 360 cm (142 in)
- Block: 340 cm (134 in)

Volleyball information
- Position: Opposite
- Current club: (Russia) Zenit Saint Petersburg
- Number: 17

Career
Years	Teams
2013–2016; 2016–2020; 2020–	(Russia) Zenit Kazan (Russia) Kuzbass Kemerovo (Russia) Zenit Saint Petersburg

National team
2015–	Russia
Honours
Volleyball
Representing ROC
Olympic Games
Silver medal – second place	2020 Tokyo	Team
Representing Russia
FIVB Nations League
Gold medal – first place	2018 Lille	Team
Gold medal – first place	2019 Chicago	Team
European Games
Bronze medal – third place	2015 Azerbaijan	Team
World U21 Championship
Gold medal – first place	2013 Turkey	Under-21
World U19 Championship
Gold medal – first place	2013 Mexico	Under-19
European Junior Championship
Gold medal – first place	2014 Slovakia/Czech Republic	Under-20
European Youth Championship
Gold medal – first place	2013 Bosnia and Herzegovina/Serbia	Under-19

Viktor Evgenyevich Poletaev (Russian: Виктор Евгеньевич Полетаев, IPA: [ˈvʲiktər jɪvˈɡʲenʲjɪvʲɪtɕ pəlʲɪˈtajɪf]; born 27 July 1995) is a Russian volleyball player. He is a member of the Russia men's national volleyball team and Russian club Zenit Saint Petersburg.

== Career ==
=== National team ===
In 2012–2013 he was a member of Russia men's national volleyball team U19. In 2013 he won with this team his first medal at European Championship U19 and he received individual award for Most valuable player. Then he achieved a title of World Champion U19 and he was Best opposite spiker. In the same year he went to team Russia U21, where as 18 year old player achieved gold at World Championship U21 and title of Most valuable Player. In 2014 gained title of European Champion U21. In 2015 Poletaev went to senior team of Russia and took part in first senior tournament in his career – European Games 2015. He won with team mates bronze medal.

== Sporting achievements ==
=== Clubs ===
- CEV Champions League
  - 2014/2015 – with Zenit Kazan
  - 2015/2016 – with Zenit Kazan
- FIVB Club World Championship
  - Betim 2015 – with Zenit Kazan
- CEV Cup
  - 2020/2021 – with Zenit Saint Petersburg
- National championships
  - 2013/2014 Russian Championship, with Zenit Kazan
  - 2014/2015 Russian Cup, with Zenit Kazan
  - 2014/2015 Russian Championship, with Zenit Kazan
  - 2015/2016 Russian SuperCup, with Zenit Kazan
  - 2015/2016 Russian Cup, with Zenit Kazan
  - 2015/2016 Russian Championship, with Zenit Kazan
  - 2018/2019 Russian Championship, with Kuzbass Kemerovo
  - 2019/2020 Russian SuperCup, with Kuzbass Kemerovo

=== Youth national team ===
- 2013 CEV U19 European Championship
- 2013 FIVB U19 World Championship
- 2013 FIVB U21 World Championship
- 2014 CEV U20 European Championship

=== Individual awards ===
- 2013: CEV U19 European Championship – Most valuable player
- 2013: FIVB U19 World Championship – Best opposite spiker
- 2013: FIVB U21 World Championship – Most valuable player
