= Bojan Rajković =

Serbian volleyball player (born 1991)

Bojan Rajkovic

Personal information
- Nationality: Serbian
- Born: 15 February 1991 (age 35)
- Height: 190 cm (6 ft 3 in)
- Weight: 71 kg (157 lb)
- Spike: 315 cm (124 in)
- Block: 302 cm (119 in)

Volleyball information
- Number: 25 (national team)

Career
Years	Teams
2015	Partizan

National team
2015	Serbia
Honours
U19 World Championship
Gold medal – first place	2009 Italy

Bojan Rajkovic (born 15 February 1991) is a Serbian male volleyball player. He is part of the Serbia men's national volleyball team. At the club level, he plays for Partizan.
