= 2023 FIVB Volleyball Boys' U19 World Championship =

2023 FIVB Volleyball Boy's U19 World Championship
Tournament details
- Host country: Argentina
- City: San Juan
- Dates: 2 – 11 August 2023
- Teams: 20
- Venues: 2 (in 1 host city)

Final positions
- Champions: France (1st title)
- Runners-up: Iran
- Third place: South Korea
- Fourth place: United States

Tournament awards
- MVP: (France) Mathis Henno
- Best Setter: (France) Amir Tizi-Oualou
- Best OH: (France) Mathis Henno (South Korea) Lee Woo-jin
- Best MB: (France) Joris Seddik (Iran) Armin Ghelichniazi
- Best OPP: (France) Thomas Pujol
- Best Libero: (Iran) Seyed Morteza Tabatabaei

Tournament statistics
- Matches played: 71
- Attendance: 46,752 (658 per match)

The 2023 FIVB Volleyball Boys' U19 World Championship was the 18th edition of the FIVB Volleyball Boys' U19 World Championship, the biennial international youth volleyball championship contested by the men's national teams under the age of 19 of the members associations of the Fédération Internationale de Volleyball (FIVB), the sport's global governing body. It was held in San Juan, Argentina from 2 to 13 August 2023.

Athletes must born on or after 1 January 2005.

Poland are the defending champions.

== Host selection ==
On 2 June 2022, FIVB opened the bidding process for member associations whose countries were interested in hosting one of the four Age Group World Championships in 2023 (i.e., U19 Boys' and Girls' World Championships and U21 Men's and Women's World Championships). The expression of interest of the member associations had to be submitted to FIVB by 29 July 2022, 18:00 CEST (UTC+2).

FIVB announced the hosts for its four Age Group World Championship on 24 January 2023, with Argentina being selected to host the 2023 Boys' U19 World Championship. Previously, Argentina had been announced as host country by the Argentine Volleyball Federation on 20 December 2022. This will be the third time that Argentina hosts the FIVB Boys' U19 World Championship having previously done so in 2011 and 2015.

== Qualification ==
A total of 20 national teams qualified for the final tournament. In addition to Argentina who qualified automatically as hosts, the other 19 teams qualified through five separate continental competitions which had to be completed by 31 December 2022 at the latest.

The slot allocation was set as follows:

- AVC (Asia & Oceania): 4
- CAVB (Africa): 2
- CEV (Europe): 6
- CSV (South America): 3
- NORCECA (North, Central America and Caribbean): 4
- Host: 1

Confederation	Qualifying tournament	Team qualified	Appearances			Previous best performance
Confederation	Qualifying tournament	Team qualified	Total	First	Last	Previous best performance
AVC (Asia & Oceania)	2022 Asian Boys' U18 Championship ( (Iran) Tehran, 15–22 August)	Japan	12th	1989	2019	Runners-up (1993)
AVC (Asia & Oceania)	2022 Asian Boys' U18 Championship ( (Iran) Tehran, 15–22 August)	Iran	14th	1989	2021	Champions (2007, 2017)
AVC (Asia & Oceania)	2022 Asian Boys' U18 Championship ( (Iran) Tehran, 15–22 August)	India	6th	2003	2021	Runners-up (2003)
AVC (Asia & Oceania)	2022 Asian Boys' U18 Championship ( (Iran) Tehran, 15–22 August)	South Korea	12th	1989	2019	Third place (1991, 1993)
CAVB (Africa)	2022 U19 Boys' African Nations Championship ( (Morocco) El Jadida, 1–11 September)	Nigeria	3rd	2019	2021	Fourteenth place (2019, 2021)
CAVB (Africa)	2022 U19 Boys' African Nations Championship ( (Morocco) El Jadida, 1–11 September)	Egypt	13th	1993	2021	Fourth place (2001, 2019)
CEV (Europe)	2022 Boys' U18 European Championship ( (Georgia (country)) Tbilisi, 9–17 July)	Italy	11th	1995	2021	Champions (1997, 2019)
CEV (Europe)	2022 Boys' U18 European Championship ( (Georgia (country)) Tbilisi, 9–17 July)	France	14th	1989	2017	Third place (2007)
CEV (Europe)	2022 Boys' U18 European Championship ( (Georgia (country)) Tbilisi, 9–17 July)	Bulgaria	8th	1989	2021	Runners-up (2021)
CEV (Europe)	2022 Boys' U18 European Championship ( (Georgia (country)) Tbilisi, 9–17 July)	Serbia	3rd	2009	2011	Champions (2009, 2011)
CEV (Europe)	2022 Boys' U18 European Championship ( (Georgia (country)) Tbilisi, 9–17 July)	Slovenia	1st	Debut		None
CEV (Europe)	2022 Boys' U18 European Championship ( (Georgia (country)) Tbilisi, 9–17 July)	Belgium	5th	2007	2021	Sixth place (2007)
CSV (South America)	2022 Boys' U19 South American Championship ( (Brazil) Araguari, 24–28 August)	Brazil	18th (all)	1989	2021	Champions (1989, 1991, 1993, 1995, 2001, 2003)
CSV (South America)	2022 Boys' U19 South American Championship ( (Brazil) Araguari, 24–28 August)	Colombia	3rd	2019	2021	Fifteenth place (2021)
CSV (South America)	2022 Boys' U19 South American Championship ( (Brazil) Araguari, 24–28 August)	Chile	4th	2013	2017	Thirteenth place (2013)
CSV (South America)	Host nation	Argentina	13th	1989	2021	Runners-up (2015)
NORCECA (North, Central America and Caribbean)	2022 Boys' Youth Pan-American Cup ( Guatemala City, 21–29 May)	United States	9th	1995	2019	Seventh place (1995, 2015)
NORCECA (North, Central America and Caribbean)	2022 Boys' Youth Pan-American Cup ( Guatemala City, 21–29 May)	Mexico	9th	1999	2019	Twelfth place (2007)
NORCECA (North, Central America and Caribbean)	2022 Boys' Youth Pan-American Cup ( Guatemala City, 21–29 May)	Puerto Rico	10th	1989	2017	Fourth place (1995)
NORCECA (North, Central America and Caribbean)	2022 Boys' Youth Pan-American Cup ( Guatemala City, 21–29 May)	Costa Rica	2nd	1993	1993	Ninth place (1993)

== Pools composition ==
The draw for the pools composition was held on 31 March 2023 at the FIVB headquarters in Lausanne, Switzerland. The 20 teams were split into four pools of five. The hosts Argentina and the top seven teams of the Boys' U19 FIVB World Ranking in force at that time (as of 24 October 2022) were seeded in the first two positions of each pool following the serpentine system. FIVB reserved the right to seed the host team as head of pool A regardless of their position in the World Ranking. The remaining 12 teams were divided into three pots of four, according to their position in the same Boys' U19 FIVB World Ranking, in order to be drawn to complete the following three positions in each pool.

Boys' U19 FIVB World Ranking of each team as of 24 October 2022 are shown in brackets, except the hosts Argentina who ranked 4th.

Seeded teams		Teams to be drawn		
Line 1	Line 2	Pot 1 (line 3)	Pot 2 (line 4)	Pot 3 (line 5)
Argentina (Hosts, assigned to A1); Bulgaria (1), assigned to B1; Iran (2), assigned to C1; Italy (5), assigned to D1	Brazil (7), assigned to D2; Nigeria (8), assigned to C2; India (8), assigned to B2; Egypt (10), assigned to A2	Colombia (11); Japan (13); United States (13); Belgium (17)	France (18); Mexico (18); Puerto Rico (20); Serbia (22)	South Korea (22); Chile (22); Costa Rica (22); Slovenia (29)

The draw procedure also followed the serpentine system and was as follows:

- Teams from pot 1 were drawn first and were placed in line 3 of each pool starting from pool A to pool D.
- Teams from pot 2 were then drawn and placed in line 4 of each pool starting from pool D to pool A.
- Teams from pot 3 were drawn at the end and were placed in line 5 of each pool starting from pool A to pool D.

The pools composition after the draw was as follow:

Pool A
Pos	Team
A1	Argentina
A2	Egypt
A3	United States
A4	Serbia
A5	Costa Rica

Pool B
Pos	Team
B1	Bulgaria
B2	India
B3	Japan
B4	France
B5	Slovenia

Pool C
Pos	Team
C1	Iran
C2	Nigeria
C3	Colombia
C4	Puerto Rico
C5	South Korea

Pool D
Pos	Team
D1	Italy
D2	Brazil
D3	Belgium
D4	Mexico
D5	Chile

== Format ==
Twenty teams are divided into 4 pools of five in round-robin system. The best four teams from each pool will qualify for the playoffs, while the rest will participate in the classification for 17th to 20th place.

== Preliminary round ==
- All times are Argentina Time (UTC−03:00).

=== Pool A ===
Pos	Team	Pld	W	L	Pts	SW	SL	SR	SPW	SPL	SPR	Qualification
1	United States	4	3	1	9	10	3	3.333	307	257	1.195	Round of 16
2	Egypt	4	3	1	9	9	5	1.800	333	319	1.044	Round of 16
3	Argentina	4	2	2	6	7	6	1.167	293	267	1.097	Round of 16
4	Serbia	4	2	2	6	7	7	1.000	311	303	1.026	Round of 16
5	Costa Rica	4	0	4	0	0	12	0.000	202	300	0.673	17th–20th places

Source: Match results

Date	Time		Score		Set 1	Set 2	Set 3	Set 4	Set 5	Total	Report
Aug 2	18:00	Egypt	3–1	Serbia	25–16	18–25	30–28	28–26		101–95	P2 Report
Aug 2	21:00	Argentina	3–0	Costa Rica	25–14	25–16	25–13			75–43	P2 Report
Aug 3	18:00	United States	3–0	Costa Rica	25–20	25–16	25–15			75–51	P2 Report
Aug 3	21:00	Argentina	3–0	Serbia	25–14	25–12	25–22			75–48	P2 Report
Aug 4	18:00	Serbia	3–0	Costa Rica	25–13	25–18	25–15			75–46	P2 Report
Aug 4	21:00	Egypt	0–3	United States	14–25	18–25	24–26			56–76	P2 Report
Aug 5	18:00	Egypt	3–0	Costa Rica	25–20	25–21	25–21			75–62	P2 Report
Aug 5	21:00	Argentina	0–3	United States	19–25	18–25	20–25			57–75	P2 Report
Aug 6	18:00	United States	1–3	Serbia	22–25	25–18	21–25	13–25		81–93	P2 Report
Aug 6	21:00	Argentina	1–3	Egypt	16–25	28–26	21–25	21–25		86–101	P2 Report

=== Pool B ===
Pos	Team	Pld	W	L	Pts	SW	SL	SR	SPW	SPL	SPR	Qualification
1	France	4	4	0	12	12	2	6.000	345	261	1.322	Round of 16
2	Bulgaria	4	3	1	8	10	6	1.667	379	345	1.099	Round of 16
3	Slovenia	4	2	2	7	8	7	1.143	332	311	1.068	Round of 16
4	Japan	4	1	3	3	6	9	0.667	338	350	0.966	Round of 16
5	India	4	0	4	0	0	12	0.000	173	300	0.577	17th–20th places

Source: Match results

Date	Time		Score		Set 1	Set 2	Set 3	Set 4	Set 5	Total	Report
Aug 2	11:00	India	0–3	France	8–25	8–25	18–25			34–75	P2 Report
Aug 2	14:00	Bulgaria	3–2	Slovenia	25–16	23–25	24–26	27–25	15–9	114–101	P2 Report
Aug 3	11:00	Japan	1–3	Slovenia	23–25	13–25	25–21	16–25		77–96	P2 Report
Aug 3	14:00	Bulgaria	1–3	France	21–25	25–20	18–25	19–25		83–95	P2 Report
Aug 4	11:00	Slovenia	0–3	France	18–25	20–25	22–25			60–75	P2 Report
Aug 4	14:00	India	0–3	Japan	12–25	16–25	19–25			47–75	P2 Report
Aug 5	11:00	India	0–3	Slovenia	9–25	15–25	21–25			45–75	P2 Report
Aug 5	14:00	Bulgaria	3–1	Japan	34–32	26–24	22–25	25–21		107–102	P2 Report
Aug 6	11:00	Japan	1–3	France	15–25	27–25	19–25	23–25		84–100	P2 Report
Aug 6	14:00	Bulgaria	3–0	India	25–16	25–14	25–17			75–47	P2 Report

=== Pool C ===
Pos	Team	Pld	W	L	Pts	SW	SL	SR	SPW	SPL	SPR	Qualification
1	Iran	4	4	0	12	12	0	MAX	300	159	1.887	Round of 16
2	South Korea	4	3	1	9	9	4	2.250	309	206	1.500	Round of 16
3	Colombia	4	2	2	6	7	6	1.167	291	230	1.265	Round of 16
4	Puerto Rico	4	1	3	3	3	9	0.333	221	226	0.978	Round of 16
5	Nigeria (Note: Nigeria withdrew just before the start of the event)	4	0	4	0	0	12	0.000	0	300	0.000	17th–20th places

Source: Match results
Notes:

Date	Time		Score		Set 1	Set 2	Set 3	Set 4	Set 5	Total	Report
Aug 2	14:00	Iran	3–0	South Korea	25–20	25–20	25–23			75–63	P2 Report
Aug 3	11:00	Colombia	1–3	South Korea	18–25	25–27	25–19	21–25		89–96	P2 Report
Aug 3	14:00	Iran	3–0	Puerto Rico	25–18	25–15	25–12			75–45	P2 Report
Aug 4	11:00	Puerto Rico	0–3	South Korea	13–25	18–25	11–25			42–75	P2 Report
Aug 5	14:00	Iran	3–0	Colombia	25–13	25–22	25–16			75–51	P2 Report
Aug 6	11:00	Colombia	3–0	Puerto Rico	25–14	25–21	26–24			76–59	P2 Report

Forfeited Nigeria games following their withdrawal:

Date	Time		Score		Set 1	Set 2	Set 3	Set 4	Set 5	Total	Report
Aug 2	11:00	Nigeria	0–3	Puerto Rico	0–25	0–25	0–25			0–75	P2 Report
Aug 4	14:00	Nigeria	0–3	Colombia	0–25	0–25	0–25			0–75	P2 Report
Aug 5	11:00	Nigeria	0–3	South Korea	0–25	0–25	0–25			0–75	P2 Report
Aug 6	14:00	Iran	3–0	Nigeria	25–0	25–0	25–0			75–0	P2 Report

=== Pool D ===
Pos	Team	Pld	W	L	Pts	SW	SL	SR	SPW	SPL	SPR	Qualification
1	Italy	4	4	0	12	12	2	6.000	348	279	1.247	Round of 16
2	Belgium	4	3	1	8	10	5	2.000	334	320	1.044	Round of 16
3	Brazil	4	2	2	7	9	6	1.500	341	311	1.096	Round of 16
4	Mexico	4	1	3	3	3	10	0.300	268	305	0.879	Round of 16
5	Chile	4	0	4	0	1	12	0.083	244	320	0.763	17th–20th places

Source: Match results

Date	Time		Score		Set 1	Set 2	Set 3	Set 4	Set 5	Total	Report
Aug 2	17:00	Brazil	3–0	Mexico	25–19	25–17	25–23			75–59	P2 Report
Aug 2	20:00	Italy	3–0	Chile	25–19	25–16	25–19			75–54	P2 Report
Aug 3	17:00	Belgium	3–0	Chile	25–21	25–18	25–22			75–61	P2 Report
Aug 3	20:00	Italy	3–0	Mexico	25–20	25–15	25–21			75–56	P2 Report
Aug 4	17:00	Mexico	3–1	Chile	25–14	25–19	20–25	25–22		95–80	P2 Report
Aug 4	20:00	Brazil	2–3	Belgium	25–18	25–21	21–25	18–25	13–15	102–104	P2 Report
Aug 5	17:00	Brazil	3–0	Chile	25–11	25–17	25–21			75–49	P2 Report
Aug 5	20:00	Italy	3–1	Belgium	25–16	25–15	23–25	26–24		99–80	P2 Report
Aug 6	17:00	Belgium	3–0	Mexico	25–19	25–22	25–17			75–58	P2 Report
Aug 6	20:00	Italy	3–1	Brazil	25–17	25–23	24–26	25–23		99–89	P2 Report

== Final round ==
- All times are Argentina Time (UTC−03:00).

=== 17th–20th places ===
Pos	Team	Pld	W	L	Pts	SW	SL	SR	SPW	SPL	SPR
17	India	3	2	1	7	8	3	2.667	258	162	1.593
18	Costa Rica	3	2	1	6	8	5	1.600	279	209	1.335
19	Chile	3	2	1	5	6	5	1.200	236	177	1.333
20	Nigeria (Note: Nigeria withdrew just before the start of the event)	3	0	3	0	0	9	0.000	0	225	0.000

Source: Match results
Notes:

Date	Time		Score		Set 1	Set 2	Set 3	Set 4	Set 5	Total	Report
Aug 8	09:00	India	3–0	Chile	27–25	25–16	25–17			77–58	P2 Report
Aug 9	09:00	Costa Rica	2–3	Chile	15–25	25–17	25–19	20–25	15–17	100–103	P2 Report
Aug 10	09:00	Costa Rica	3–2	India	25–21	25–23	20–25	19–25	15–12	104–106	P2 Report

Forfeited Nigeria games following their withdrawal:

Date	Time		Score		Set 1	Set 2	Set 3	Set 4	Set 5	Total	Report
Aug 8	09:00	Costa Rica	3–0	Nigeria	25–0	25–0	25–0			75–0	P2 Report
Aug 9	09:00	India	3–0	Nigeria	25–0	25–0	25–0			75–0	P2 Report
Aug 10	09:00	Nigeria	0–3	Chile	0–25	0–25	0–25			0–75	P2 Report

=== 1st–16th places ===
Round of 16
Aug 8
United States	3
Puerto Rico	0
Aug 8
Bulgaria	3
Brazil	2
Aug 8
France	3
Mexico	0
Aug 8
Egypt	3
Colombia	1
Aug 8
Iran	3
Serbia	2
Aug 8
Belgium	3
Slovenia	1
Aug 8
Italy	3
Japan	0
Aug 8
South Korea	3
Argentina	2

Quarterfinals
Aug 9
United States	3
Bulgaria	0
Aug 9
France	3
Egypt	0
Aug 9
Iran	3
Belgium	0
Aug 9
Italy	0
South Korea	3

Semifinals
Aug 10
United States	0
France	3
Aug 10
Iran	3
South Korea	1

Final
Aug 11
France	3
Iran	1
3rd place match
Aug 11
United States	1
South Korea	3

9th–16th quarterfinals
Aug 9
Puerto Rico	0
Brazil	3
Aug 9
Mexico	3
Colombia	2
Aug 9
Serbia	0
Slovenia	3
Aug 9
Japan	3
Argentina	2

9th–12th semifinals
Aug 10
Brazil	3
Mexico	1
Aug 10
Slovenia	3
Japan	1

9th place match
Aug 11
Brazil	3
Slovenia	2
11th place match
Aug 11
Mexico	0
Japan	3

13th–16th semifinals
Aug 10
Puerto Rico	2
Colombia	3
Aug 10
Serbia	1
Argentina	3

13th place match
Aug 11
Colombia	0
Argentina	3
15th place match
Aug 11
Puerto Rico	0
Serbia	3

5th–8th semifinals
Aug 10
Bulgaria	3
Egypt	2
Aug 10
Belgium	3
Italy	2

5th place match
Aug 11
Bulgaria	3
Belgium	1
7th place match
Aug 11
Egypt	0
Italy	3

=== Round of 16 ===
Date	Time		Score		Set 1	Set 2	Set 3	Set 4	Set 5	Total	Report
Aug 8	11:00	Egypt	3–1	Colombia	25–21	20–25	25–16	30–28		100–90	P2 Report
Aug 8	12:00	Belgium	3–1	Slovenia	25–18	26–28	31–29	25–22		107–97	P2 Report
Aug 8	14:00	Iran	3–2	Serbia	11–25	25–19	24–26	25–18	15–12	100–100	P2 Report
Aug 8	15:00	France	3–0	Mexico	25–19	25–15	25–13			75–47	P2 Report
Aug 8	18:00	United States	3–0	Puerto Rico	28–26	25–17	25–17			78–60	P2 Report
Aug 8	18:00	Bulgaria	3–2	Brazil	25–17	19–25	23–25	25–14	15–9	107–90	P2 Report
Aug 8	21:00	Italy	3–0	Japan	25–20	25–12	25–23			75–55	P2 Report
Aug 8	21:00	South Korea	3–2	Argentina	17–25	25–21	25–20	17–25	15–9	99–100	P2 Report

=== 9th–16th quarterfinals ===
Date	Time		Score		Set 1	Set 2	Set 3	Set 4	Set 5	Total	Report
Aug 9	12:00	Brazil	3–0	Puerto Rico	25–9	25–11	25–18			75–38	P2 Report
Aug 9	15:00	Mexico	3–2	Colombia	25–23	17–25	23–25	25–22	15–12	105–107	P2 Report
Aug 9	18:00	Serbia	0–3	Slovenia	17–25	21–25	23–25			61–75	P2 Report
Aug 9	21:00	Japan	3–2	Argentina	25–22	25–18	18–25	20–25	15–11	103–101	P2 Report

==== 13th–16th semifinals ====
Date	Time		Score		Set 1	Set 2	Set 3	Set 4	Set 5	Total	Report
Aug 10	12:00	Puerto Rico	2–3	Colombia	25–21	24–26	25–17	21–25	10–15	105–104	P2 Report
Aug 10	15:00	Serbia	1–3	Argentina	25–8	20–25	20–25	19–25		84–83	P2 Report

===== 15th place match =====
Date	Time		Score		Set 1	Set 2	Set 3	Set 4	Set 5	Total	Report
Aug 11	09:00	Puerto Rico	0–3	Serbia	23–25	19–25	23–25			65–75	P2 Report

===== 13th place match =====
Date	Time		Score		Set 1	Set 2	Set 3	Set 4	Set 5	Total	Report
Aug 11	15:00	Colombia	0–3	Argentina	21–25	19–25	8–25			48–75	P2 Report

==== 9th–12th semifinals ====
Date	Time		Score		Set 1	Set 2	Set 3	Set 4	Set 5	Total	Report
Aug 10	18:00	Brazil	3–1	Mexico	24–26	25–10	25–16	25–19		99–71	P2 Report
Aug 10	21:00	Slovenia	3–1	Japan	25–20	25–6	17–25	25–17		92–68	P2 Report

===== 11th place match =====
Date	Time		Score		Set 1	Set 2	Set 3	Set 4	Set 5	Total	Report
Aug 11	12:00	Mexico	0–3	Japan	18–25	18–25	14–25			50–75	P2 Report

===== 9th place match =====
Date	Time		Score		Set 1	Set 2	Set 3	Set 4	Set 5	Total	Report
Aug 11	18:00	Brazil	3–2	Slovenia	20–25	25–15	25–18	22–25	16–14	108–97	P2 Report

=== Quarterfinals ===
Date	Time		Score		Set 1	Set 2	Set 3	Set 4	Set 5	Total	Report
Aug 9	11:00	United States	3–0	Bulgaria	25–21	25–21	28-26			78–42	P2 Report
Aug 9	14:00	France	3–0	Egypt	25–21	25–11	25–17			75–49	P2 Report
Aug 9	18:00	Iran	3–0	Belgium	25–20	25–15	25–12			75–47	P2 Report
Aug 9	21:00	Italy	0–3	South Korea	25–27	16–25	26–28			67–80	P2 Report

=== 5th–8th semifinals ===
Date	Time		Score		Set 1	Set 2	Set 3	Set 4	Set 5	Total	Report
Aug 10	11:00	Bulgaria	3–2	Egypt	25–23	26–28	25–21	22–25	15–12	113–109	P2 Report
Aug 10	14:00	Belgium	3–2	Italy	18–25	25–22	16–25	25–20	17–15	101–107	P2 Report

==== 7th place match ====
Date	Time		Score		Set 1	Set 2	Set 3	Set 4	Set 5	Total	Report
Aug 11	11:00	Egypt	0–3	Italy	16–25	22–25	23–25			61–75	P2 Report

==== 5th place match ====
Date	Time		Score		Set 1	Set 2	Set 3	Set 4	Set 5	Total	Report
Aug 11	14:00	Bulgaria	3–1	Belgium	25–23	21–25	25–9	25–22		96–79	P2 Report

=== Semifinals ===
Date	Time		Score		Set 1	Set 2	Set 3	Set 4	Set 5	Total	Report
Aug 10	18:00	United States	0–3	France	10–25	17–25	12–25			39–75	P2 Report
Aug 10	21:00	Iran	3–1	South Korea	18–25	25–21	25–20	25–16		93–82	P2 Report

=== 3rd place match ===
Date	Time		Score		Set 1	Set 2	Set 3	Set 4	Set 5	Total	Report
Aug 11	17:00	United States	1–3	South Korea	18–25	19–25	25–21	23–25		85–96	P2 Report

=== Final ===
Date	Time		Score		Set 1	Set 2	Set 3	Set 4	Set 5	Total	Report
Aug 11	20:00	France	3–1	Iran	25–22	16–25	25–18	25–21		91–86	P2 Report

== Final standing ==
Rank	Team
1st place, gold medalist(s)	France
2nd place, silver medalist(s)	Iran
3rd place, bronze medalist(s)	South Korea
4	United States
5	Bulgaria
6	Belgium
7	Italy
8	Egypt
9	Brazil
10	Slovenia
11	Japan
12	Mexico
13	Argentina
14	Colombia
15	Serbia
16	Puerto Rico
17	India
18	Costa Rica
19	Chile
20	Nigeria

Qualified for the 2025 U19 World Championship

2023 Men's U21 World champions

France
First title

12–boy roster
Noa Duflos Rossi, Amir Tizi-Oualou, Mathis Henno (c), Bastien Scherer, Adrien Roure, Thomas Pujol, Enzo Lopez, Tom Leroyer, Jules Duthoit, Joris Seddik, Yann Laurencé, [[Malick Diouf] (volleyball)|Malick Diouf]]
Head coach
Slimane Belmadi

== Awards ==
- Most valuable player
  (France) Mathis Henno
- Best setter
  (France) Tizi-Oualou Amir
- Best outside spikers
  (South Korea) Lee Woo-jin
  (France) Mathis Henno
- Best middle blockers
  (Iran) Ghelichniazi Armin
  (France) Seddik Joris
- Best opposite spiker
  (France) Pujol Thomas
- Best libero
  (Iran) Tabatabaei Seyed Morteza

== See also ==
- 2023 FIVB Volleyball Girls' U19 World Championship
