= 2013 Boys' Youth European Volleyball Championship Qualification =

The qualification for the 2013 Boys' Youth European Volleyball Championship was held from January 8–11, 2015. 31 teams are split into eight groups of 3 or 4 teams. The group winners and second placed teams were qualified for the 2015 Boys' Youth European Volleyball Championship in Bosnia and Herzegovina and Serbia.

== Competing nations ==
| Pool A | Pool B | Pool C | Pool D | Pool E |
|---|---|---|---|---|
| Belarus; Czech Republic; France; Germany; Italy | Estonia; Latvia; Norway; Russia; Slovenia; Ukraine | Bulgaria; England; Israel; Poland; Portugal; Slovakia | Austria; Lithuania; Netherlands; Romania; Spain; Turkey | Belgium; Croatia; Denmark; Finland; Greece; Hungary |

== Pool A ==
The mini-tournament was hosted in Brno, Czech Republic.

| Pos | Team | Pld | W | L | Pts | SW | SL | SR | SPW | SPL | SPR | Qualification |
|---|---|---|---|---|---|---|---|---|---|---|---|---|
| 1 | Italy | 4 | 4 | 0 | 12 | 12 | 1 | 12.000 | 334 | 247 | 1.352 | 2013 Boys' Youth European Volleyball Championship |
| 2 | France | 4 | 2 | 2 | 6 | 9 | 8 | 1.125 | 380 | 392 | 0.969 | 2013 Boys' Youth European Volleyball Championship |
| 3 | Germany | 4 | 2 | 2 | 6 | 8 | 8 | 1.000 | 336 | 329 | 1.021 | |
| 4 | Belarus | 4 | 2 | 2 | 6 | 8 | 10 | 0.800 | 359 | 363 | 0.989 | |
| 5 | Czech Republic | 4 | 0 | 4 | 0 | 2 | 12 | 0.167 | 257 | 335 | 0.767 | |

| Date | Time | | Score | | Set 1 | Set 2 | Set 3 | Set 4 | Set 5 | Total | Report |
|---|---|---|---|---|---|---|---|---|---|---|---|
| 3 Jan | 15:00 | Belarus | 2–3 | Germany | 19–25 | 25–20 | 25–21 | 18–25 | 10–15 | 97–106 | Report |
| 3 Jan | 20:00 | Czech Republic | 0–3 | France | 23–25 | 27–29 | 22–25 | | | 72–79 | Report |
| 4 Jan | 15:00 | Italy | 3–1 | France | 25–19 | 29–31 | 25–18 | 30–28 | | 109–96 | Report |
| 4 Jan | 20:00 | Belarus | 3–2 | Czech Republic | 25–9 | 20–25 | 21–25 | 25–16 | 15–7 | 106–82 | Report |
| 5 Jan | 15:00 | Germany | 0–3 | Italy | 11–25 | 23–25 | 23–25 | | | 57–75 | Report |
| 5 Jan | 20:00 | France | 2–3 | Belarus | 25–23 | 19–25 | 27–25 | 16–25 | 13–15 | 100–113 | Report |
| 6 Jan | 15:00 | Italy | 3–0 | Belarus | 25–10 | 25–11 | 25–22 | | | 75–43 | Report |
| 6 Jan | 20:00 | Germany | 3–0 | Czech Republic | 25–20 | 25–20 | 25–12 | | | 75–52 | Report |
| 7 Jan | 15:00 | France | 3–2 | Germany | 25–23 | 19–25 | 21–25 | 25–14 | 15–11 | 105–98 | Report |
| 7 Jan | 20:00 | Czech Republic | 0–3 | Italy | 17–25 | 23–25 | 11–25 | | | 51–75 | Report |

== Pool B ==
The mini-tournament was hosted in Jelgava, Latvia.

| Pos | Team | Pld | W | L | Pts | SW | SL | SR | SPW | SPL | SPR | Qualification |
|---|---|---|---|---|---|---|---|---|---|---|---|---|
| 1 | Russia | 5 | 5 | 0 | 15 | 15 | 1 | 15.000 | 397 | 250 | 1.588 | 2013 Boys' Youth European Volleyball Championship |
| 2 | Slovenia | 5 | 4 | 1 | 12 | 12 | 5 | 2.400 | 400 | 357 | 1.120 | 2013 Boys' Youth European Volleyball Championship |
| 3 | Ukraine | 5 | 3 | 2 | 9 | 10 | 10 | 1.000 | 409 | 448 | 0.913 | |
| 4 | Estonia | 5 | 2 | 3 | 6 | 9 | 12 | 0.750 | 451 | 483 | 0.934 | |
| 5 | Norway | 5 | 1 | 4 | 3 | 8 | 14 | 0.571 | 439 | 478 | 0.918 | |
| 6 | Latvia | 5 | 0 | 5 | 0 | 3 | 15 | 0.200 | 357 | 437 | 0.817 | |

| Date | Time | | Score | | Set 1 | Set 2 | Set 3 | Set 4 | Set 5 | Total | Report |
|---|---|---|---|---|---|---|---|---|---|---|---|
| 3 Jan | 15:00 | Russia | 3–0 | Slovenia | 25–20 | 25–21 | 25–13 | | | 75–54 | Report |
| 3 Jan | 17:00 | Ukraine | 3–2 | Estonia | 22–25 | 25–22 | 25–17 | 23–25 | 21–19 | 116–108 | Report |
| 3 Jan | 19:30 | Norway | 3–2 | Latvia | 25–21 | 21–25 | 20–25 | 25–18 | 15–10 | 106–99 | Report |
| 4 Jan | 15:00 | Slovenia | 3–1 | Ukraine | 24–26 | 25–17 | 25–22 | 25–13 | | 99–78 | Report |
| 4 Jan | 17:00 | Norway | 0–3 | Russia | 12–25 | 11–25 | 23–25 | | | 46–75 | Report |
| 4 Jan | 19:30 | Latvia | 1–3 | Estonia | 30–28 | 22–25 | 23–25 | 16–25 | | 91–103 | Report |
| 5 Jan | 15:00 | Ukraine | 3–2 | Norway | 25–23 | 11–25 | 25–16 | 23–25 | 15–12 | 99–101 | Report |
| 5 Jan | 17:00 | Estonia | 0–3 | Slovenia | 20–25 | 21–25 | 18–25 | | | 59–75 | Report |
| 5 Jan | 19:30 | Russia | 3–0 | Latvia | 25–17 | 25–11 | 25–11 | | | 75–39 | Report |
| 6 Jan | 15:00 | Norway | 2–3 | Estonia | 23–25 | 25–22 | 19–25 | 25–21 | 12–15 | 104–108 | Report |
| 6 Jan | 17:00 | Russia | 3–0 | Ukraine | 25–11 | 25–12 | 25–15 | | | 75–38 | Report |
| 6 Jan | 19:30 | Latvia | 0–3 | Slovenia | 19–25 | 23–25 | 21–25 | | | 63–75 | Report |
| 7 Jan | 15:00 | Estonia | 1–3 | Russia | 13–25 | 25–22 | 18–25 | 19–25 | | 75–97 | Report |
| 7 Jan | 17:00 | Slovenia | 3–1 | Norway | 25–14 | 25–22 | 22–25 | 25–21 | | 97–82 | Report |
| 7 Jan | 19:30 | Ukraine | 3–0 | Latvia | 25–18 | 25–21 | 25–16 | | | 75–55 | Report |

== Pool C ==
The mini-tournament was hosted in Nitra, Slovakia.

| Pos | Team | Pld | W | L | Pts | SW | SL | SR | SPW | SPL | SPR | Qualification |
|---|---|---|---|---|---|---|---|---|---|---|---|---|
| 1 | Poland | 5 | 5 | 0 | 15 | 15 | 2 | 7.500 | 407 | 265 | 1.536 | 2013 Boys' Youth European Volleyball Championship |
| 2 | Bulgaria | 5 | 4 | 1 | 12 | 12 | 5 | 2.400 | 382 | 333 | 1.147 | 2013 Boys' Youth European Volleyball Championship |
| 3 | Slovakia | 5 | 3 | 2 | 9 | 13 | 6 | 2.167 | 427 | 377 | 1.133 | |
| 4 | Portugal | 5 | 2 | 3 | 6 | 6 | 10 | 0.600 | 325 | 366 | 0.888 | |
| 5 | Israel | 5 | 1 | 4 | 3 | 3 | 12 | 0.250 | 282 | 355 | 0.794 | |
| 6 | England | 5 | 0 | 5 | 0 | 1 | 15 | 0.067 | 273 | 400 | 0.683 | |

| Date | Time | | Score | | Set 1 | Set 2 | Set 3 | Set 4 | Set 5 | Total | Report |
|---|---|---|---|---|---|---|---|---|---|---|---|
| 3 Jan | 15:00 | Portugal | 0–3 | Poland | 16–25 | 21–25 | 14–25 | | | 51–75 | Report |
| 3 Jan | 17:30 | Slovakia | 3–0 | England | 25–15 | 25–19 | 25–16 | | | 75–50 | Report |
| 3 Jan | 20:00 | Bulgaria | 3–0 | Israel | 25–13 | 26–24 | 25–21 | | | 76–58 | Report |
| 4 Jan | 15:00 | Poland | 3–0 | England | 25–13 | 25–14 | 25–14 | | | 75–41 | Report |
| 4 Jan | 17:30 | Israel | 0–3 | Slovakia | 25–27 | 16–25 | 21–25 | | | 62–77 | Report |
| 4 Jan | 20:00 | Portugal | 0–3 | Bulgaria | 14–25 | 15–25 | 22–25 | | | 51–75 | Report |
| 5 Jan | 15:00 | England | 0–3 | Israel | 22–25 | 12–25 | 18–25 | | | 52–75 | Report |
| 5 Jan | 17:30 | Slovakia | 3–0 | Portugal | 25–16 | 25–14 | 25–18 | | | 75–48 | Report |
| 5 Jan | 20:00 | Bulgaria | 0–3 | Poland | 21–25 | 11–25 | 14–25 | | | 46–75 | Report |
| 6 Jan | 15:00 | Portugal | 3–1 | England | 23–25 | 25–16 | 25–23 | 27–25 | | 100–89 | Report |
| 6 Jan | 17:30 | Bulgaria | 3–2 | Slovakia | 23–25 | 25–21 | 25–23 | 21–25 | 16–14 | 110–108 | Report |
| 6 Jan | 20:00 | Poland | 3–0 | Israel | 25–9 | 25–15 | 25–11 | | | 75–35 | Report |
| 7 Jan | 15:00 | England | 0–3 | Bulgaria | 16–25 | 8–25 | 17–25 | | | 41–75 | Report |
| 7 Jan | 17:30 | Israel | 0–3 | Portugal | 23–25 | 11–25 | 18–25 | | | 52–75 | Report |
| 7 Jan | 20:00 | Slovakia | 2–3 | Poland | 25–22 | 16–25 | 25–20 | 20–25 | 6–15 | 92–107 | Report |

== Pool D ==
The mini-tournament was hosted in Ankara, Turkey.

| Pos | Team | Pld | W | L | Pts | SW | SL | SR | SPW | SPL | SPR | Qualification |
|---|---|---|---|---|---|---|---|---|---|---|---|---|
| 1 | Turkey | 5 | 5 | 0 | 15 | 15 | 2 | 7.500 | 411 | 299 | 1.375 | 2013 Boys' Youth European Volleyball Championship |
| 2 | Austria | 5 | 4 | 1 | 12 | 12 | 8 | 1.500 | 464 | 443 | 1.047 | 2013 Boys' Youth European Volleyball Championship |
| 3 | Spain | 5 | 3 | 2 | 9 | 11 | 7 | 1.571 | 418 | 359 | 1.164 | |
| 4 | Netherlands | 5 | 2 | 3 | 6 | 10 | 11 | 0.909 | 426 | 467 | 0.912 | |
| 5 | Romania | 5 | 1 | 4 | 3 | 6 | 13 | 0.462 | 411 | 435 | 0.945 | |
| 6 | Lithuania | 5 | 0 | 5 | 0 | 2 | 15 | 0.133 | 297 | 424 | 0.700 | |

| Date | Time | | Score | | Set 1 | Set 2 | Set 3 | Set 4 | Set 5 | Total | Report |
|---|---|---|---|---|---|---|---|---|---|---|---|
| 3 Jan | 14:00 | Netherlands | 1–3 | Spain | 15–25 | 25–20 | 16–25 | 13–25 | | 69–95 | Report |
| 3 Jan | 16:30 | Austria | 3–1 | Romania | 25–22 | 25–18 | 18–25 | 25–23 | | 93–88 | Report |
| 3 Jan | 19:30 | Turkey | 3–0 | Lithuania | 25–16 | 25–12 | 25–13 | | | 75–41 | Report |
| 4 Jan | 14:00 | Netherlands | 0–3 | Austria | 25–21 | 22–25 | 20–25 | 17–25 | | 84–96 | Report |
| 4 Jan | 16:30 | Spain | 3–0 | Lithuania | 25–14 | 25–15 | 25–13 | | | 75–42 | Report |
| 4 Jan | 19:30 | Romania | 0–3 | Turkey | 20–25 | 20–25 | 15–25 | | | 55–75 | Report |
| 5 Jan | 14:00 | Austria | 3–2 | Spain | 28–30 | 19–25 | 25–23 | 29–27 | 15–12 | 116–117 | Report |
| 5 Jan | 16:30 | Lithuania | 1–3 | Romania | 27–25 | 22–25 | 18–25 | 14–25 | | 81–100 | Report |
| 5 Jan | 19:30 | Turkey | 3–2 | Netherlands | 24–26 | 22–25 | 25–12 | 25–13 | 15–11 | 111–87 | Report |
| 6 Jan | 14:00 | Spain | 3–0 | Romania | 25–23 | 25–18 | 25–16 | | | 75–57 | Report |
| 6 Jan | 16:30 | Netherlands | 3–0 | Lithuania | 25–20 | 25–15 | 25–19 | | | 75–54 | Report |
| 6 Jan | 19:30 | Austria | 0–3 | Turkey | 21–25 | 20–25 | 19–25 | | | 60–75 | Report |
| 7 Jan | 14:00 | Romania | 2–3 | Netherlands | 21–25 | 27–25 | 23–25 | 25–19 | 15–17 | 111–111 | Report |
| 7 Jan | 16:30 | Lithuania | 1–3 | Austria | 26–24 | 15–25 | 21–25 | 17–25 | | 79–99 | Report |
| 7 Jan | 19:30 | Turkey | 3–0 | Spain | 25–21 | 25–18 | 25–17 | | | 75–56 | Report |

== Pool E ==
The mini-tournament was hosted in Kecskemét, Hungary.

| Pos | Team | Pld | W | L | Pts | SW | SL | SR | SPW | SPL | SPR | Qualification |
|---|---|---|---|---|---|---|---|---|---|---|---|---|
| 1 | Belgium | 5 | 5 | 0 | 15 | 15 | 4 | 3.750 | 451 | 365 | 1.236 | 2013 Boys' Youth European Volleyball Championship |
| 2 | Finland | 5 | 4 | 1 | 12 | 13 | 5 | 2.600 | 421 | 358 | 1.176 | 2013 Boys' Youth European Volleyball Championship |
| 3 | Greece | 5 | 3 | 2 | 9 | 12 | 9 | 1.333 | 462 | 446 | 1.036 | |
| 4 | Hungary | 5 | 2 | 3 | 6 | 10 | 12 | 0.833 | 471 | 485 | 0.971 | |
| 5 | Croatia | 5 | 1 | 4 | 3 | 5 | 13 | 0.385 | 380 | 430 | 0.884 | |
| 6 | Denmark | 5 | 0 | 5 | 0 | 3 | 15 | 0.200 | 332 | 433 | 0.767 | |

| Date | Time | | Score | | Set 1 | Set 2 | Set 3 | Set 4 | Set 5 | Total | Report |
|---|---|---|---|---|---|---|---|---|---|---|---|
| 3 Jan | 15:00 | Denmark | 0–3 | Belgium | 19–25 | 19–25 | 17–25 | | | 55–75 | Report |
| 3 Jan | 17:30 | Hungary | 3–1 | Croatia | 25–20 | 24–26 | 25–22 | 25–19 | | 99–87 | Report |
| 3 Jan | 20:00 | Finland | 3–1 | Greece | 25–14 | 25–16 | 18–25 | 25–19 | | 93–74 | Report |
| 4 Jan | 15:00 | Belgium | 3–0 | Croatia | 25–20 | 25–16 | 25–17 | | | 75–53 | Report |
| 4 Jan | 17:30 | Greece | 3–2 | Hungary | 19–25 | 23–25 | 25–21 | 25–17 | 16–14 | 108–102 | Report |
| 4 Jan | 20:00 | Denmark | 0–3 | Finland | 17–25 | 12–25 | 14–25 | | | 43–75 | Report |
| 5 Jan | 15:00 | Croatia | 1–3 | Greece | 25–23 | 21–25 | 27–29 | 18–25 | | 91–102 | Report |
| 5 Jan | 17:30 | Hungary | 3–2 | Denmark | 25–19 | 23–25 | 22–25 | 25–19 | 15–10 | 110–98 | Report |
| 5 Jan | 20:00 | Finland | 1–3 | Belgium | 25–23 | 23–25 | 19–25 | 19–25 | | 86–98 | Report |
| 6 Jan | 15:00 | Denmark | 1–3 | Croatia | 14–25 | 20–25 | 25–23 | 20–25 | | 79–98 | Report |
| 6 Jan | 17:30 | Finland | 3–1 | Hungary | 25–23 | 25–23 | 17–25 | 25–21 | | 92–92 | Report |
| 6 Jan | 20:00 | Belgium | 3–2 | Greece | 25–22 | 18–25 | 25–18 | 20–25 | 15–13 | 103–103 | Report |
| 7 Jan | 15:00 | Croatia | 0–3 | Finland | 15–25 | 17–25 | 19–25 | | | 51–75 | Report |
| 7 Jan | 17:30 | Hungary | 1–3 | Belgium | 27–25 | 16–25 | 15–25 | 10–25 | | 68–100 | Report |
| 7 Jan | 20:00 | Greece | 3–0 | Denmark | 25–20 | 25–22 | 25–15 | | | 75–57 | Report |
