= Sander Depovere =

Belgian volleyball player (born 1995)

Personal information
- Nationality: Belgian
- Born: 8 January 1995 (age 31)
- Height: 197 cm (6 ft 6 in)
- Weight: 82 kg (181 lb)
- Spike: 330 cm (130 in)
- Block: 305 cm (120 in)

Volleyball information
- Number: 22 (national team)

Career
Years	Teams
2015-2016; 2016-2017; 2017	Topvolley Callant Antwerpen; Par-ky Menen; Knack Roeselare

National team
2015	Belgium
Honours
U19 European Championship
Bronze medal – third place	2013 Laktaši/Belgrade

Sander Depovere (born 8 January 1995) is a Belgian male volleyball player. He is part of the Belgium men's national volleyball team. On club level he plays for Topvolley Callant Antwerpen.
