= Thomas Konings =

Belgian volleyball player (born 1997)

Personal information
- Nationality: Belgian
- Born: 7 March 1997 (age 29)
- Height: 202 cm (6 ft 8 in)
- Weight: 94 kg (207 lb)
- Spike: 357 cm (141 in)
- Block: 324 cm (128 in)

Volleyball information
- Number: 25 (national team)

Career
- Years: Team
- 2015: Topvolley Callant Antwerpen

National team
- Years: Team
- 2015: Belgium

Thomas Konings (born 7 March 1997) is a Belgian male volleyball player. He is part of the Belgium men's national volleyball team. On club level he plays for Topvolley Callant Antwerpen.
