= FIVB Volleyball Boys' U19 World Championship =

International boys' tournament

- Most recent season or competition: 2025 FIVB Volleyball Boys' U19 World Championship
- Sport: Volleyball
- Founded: 1989
- No. of teams: 24
- Continent: International (FIVB)
- Most recent champion: France (2nd title)
- Most titles: Brazil (6 titles)

The FIVB Volleyball Boys' U19 World Championship, called the FIVB Volleyball Boys' Youth World Championship between 2007 and 2011, is the world championship of volleyball for male players under the age of 19 organized by Fédération Internationale de Volleyball (FIVB).

The first edition was staged in 1989 in Dubai, United Arab Emirates and tournaments have been played every two years since then. The most recent tournament was hosted by Iran in the city of Tehran and won by Poland.

Brazil is the most successful nation in the tournament's history, with six titles and one runner-up. Russia is the second most successful with three titles and four runners-up.

A corresponding tournament for female players is the FIVB Volleyball Girls' U19 World Championship.

== Results summary ==
#	Year	Host	Final			3rd place match			Teams
#	Year	Host	Champions	Score	Runners-up	3rd place	Score	4th place	Teams
1	1989; Details	(United Arab Emirates); Dubai	Brazil	3–1	Soviet Union	Bulgaria	3–0	Iran	12
2	1991; Details	(Portugal); Porto	Brazil	3–1	Soviet Union	South Korea	3–1	Czechoslovakia	12
3	1993; Details	(Turkey); Istanbul	Brazil	3–0	Japan	South Korea	–	Portugal	12
4	1995; Details	(Puerto Rico); San Juan	Brazil	3–0	Italy	Japan	3–0	Puerto Rico	12
5	1997; Details	(Iran); Tehran	Italy	3–0	Greece	Japan	3–2	Poland	16
6	1999; Details	(Saudi Arabia); Riyadh	Russia	3–1	Venezuela	Poland	3–2	Saudi Arabia	16
7	2001; Details	(Egypt); Cairo	Brazil	3–0	Iran	Russia	3–0	Egypt	16
8	2003; Details	(Thailand); Suphanburi	Brazil	3–0	India	Iran	3–1	Czech Republic	16
9	2005; Details	(Algeria); Algiers / Oran	Russia	3–2	Brazil	Italy	3–1	Argentina	16
10	2007; Details	(Mexico); Mexicali / Tijuana	Iran	3–2	China	France	3–1	Argentina	16
11	2009; Details	(Italy); Bassano del Grappa / Jesolo	Serbia	3–2	Iran	Argentina	3–0	Russia	16
12	2011; Details	(Argentina); Bahía Blanca / Burzaco	Serbia	3–2	Spain	Cuba	3–0	France	16
13	2013; Details	(Mexico); Mexicali / Tijuana	Russia	3–1	China	Poland	3–1	Iran	20
14	2015; Details	(Argentina); Corrientes / Resistencia	Poland	3–2	Argentina	Iran	3–1	Russia	20
15	2017; Details	(Bahrain); Riffa	Iran	3–1	Russia	Japan	3–0	South Korea	20
16	2019; Details	(Tunisia); Tunis / Radès	Italy	3–1	Russia	Argentina	3–1	Egypt	20
17	2021; Details	(Iran); Tehran	Poland	3–0	Bulgaria	Iran	3–2	Russia	20
18	2023; Details	(Argentina); San Juan	France	3–1	Iran	South Korea	3–1	United States	20
19	2025; Details	(Uzbekistan); Tashkent	France	3–1	Poland	Spain	3–2	Iran	24
20	2027; Details	(India); Pune							24

== Medals summary ==
Rank	Nation	Gold	Silver	Bronze	Total
1	Brazil	6	1	0	7
2	Russia	3	2	1	6
3	Iran	2	3	3	8
4	Poland	2	1	2	5
5	Italy	2	1	1	4
6	France	2	0	1	3
7	Serbia	2	0	0	2
8	China	0	2	0	2
8	Soviet Union	0	2	0	2
10	Japan	0	1	3	4
11	Argentina	0	1	2	3
12	Bulgaria	0	1	1	2
12	Spain	0	1	1	2
14	Greece	0	1	0	1
14	India	0	1	0	1
14	Venezuela	0	1	0	1
17	South Korea	0	0	3	3
18	Cuba	0	0	1	1
Totals (18 entries)		19	19	19	57

== Appearance ==
Legend

- 1st – Champions
- 2nd – Runners-up
- 3rd – Third place
- 4th – Fourth place
- • – Did not enter / Did not qualify / Withdrew
- – Hosts
- Q – Qualified for forthcoming tournament

Team	(United Arab Emirates); 1989 (12)	(Portugal); 1991 (12)	(Turkey); 1993 (12)	(Puerto Rico); 1995 (12)	(Iran); 1997 (16)	(Saudi Arabia); 1999 (16)	(Egypt); 2001 (16)	(Thailand); 2003 (16)	(Algeria); 2005 (16)	(Mexico); 2007 (16)	(Italy); 2009 (16)	(Argentina); 2011 (16)	(Mexico); 2013 (20)	(Argentina); 2015 (20)	(Bahrain); 2017 (20)	(Tunisia); 2019 (20)	(Iran); 2021 (20)	(Argentina); 2023 (20)	(Uzbekistan); 2025 (24)	Total
Algeria	•	12th	•	•	•	13th	•	•	13th	•	16th	•	19th	•	•	•	•	•	24th	6
Argentina	7th	5th	•	•	•	•	9th	•	4th	4th	3rd	5th	6th	2nd	12th	3rd	5th	13th	12th	14
Australia	•	•	•	•	•	•	•	8th	•	•	•	•	•	•	•	•	•	•	•	1
Bahrain	•	11th	•	•	•	•	•	•	•	•	•	•	•	•	13th	•	•	•	•	2
Belarus	•	•	9th	•	•	•	•	•	•	•	•	•	•	•	•	8th	17th	•	•	3
Belgium	•	•	•	•	•	•	•	•	•	6th	•	•	9th	17th	•	•	11th	6th	11th	6
Brazil	1st	1st	1st	1st	5th	7th	1st	1st	2nd	7th	9th	9th	5th	6th	8th	9th	7th	9th	10th	19
Bulgaria	3rd	8th	•	•	•	•	•	•	9th	•	•	6th	•	12th	•	7th	2nd	5th	6th	9
Cameroon	•	•	•	•	•	•	•	•	•	•	•	•	•	•	•	•	18th	•	•	1
Canada	•	•	•	•	•	•	•	•	13th	•	•	•	•	•	•	•	•	•	23rd	2
Chile	•	•	•	•	•	•	•	•	•	•	•	•	13th	16th	19th	•	•	19th	•	4
China	•	•	•	•	•	9th	•	9th	•	2nd	•	8th	2nd	8th	10th	•	•	•	9th	8
Chinese Taipei	•	•	•	5th	13th	•	9th	•	•	•	•	•	•	18th	•	16th	•	•	•	5
Colombia	•	•	•	•	•	•	•	•	•	•	•	•	•	•	•	20th	15th	14th	19th	4
Costa Rica	•	•	9th	•	•	•	•	•	•	•	•	•	•	•	•	•	•	18th	•	2
Croatia	•	•	•	9th	•	•	•	•	•	•	•	•	•	•	•	•	•	•	•	1
Cuba	•	10th	•	9th	9th	•	•	•	•	13th	•	3rd	7th	10th	16th	12th	15th	•	17th	11
Czech Republic	9th	4th	•	•	6th	8th	9th	4th	•	•	•	•	•	•	7th	10th	9th	•	•	9 (Note: Czech Republic's total includes two appearances as Czechoslovakia in 1989 and 1991.)
Dominican Republic	•	•	•	•	8th	13th	•	•	•	•	•	•	•	•	•	19th	19th	•	•	4
Egypt	•	•	8th	•	13th	•	4th	9th	9th	16th	13th	12th	12th	20th	6th	4th	12th	8th	21st	15
Finland	•	•	7th	•	•	•	•	•	•	•	•	•	11th	•	•	•	•	•	7th	3
France	9th	7th	•	11th	7th	9th	7th	•	6th	3rd	12th	4th	8th	11th	5th	•	•	1st	1st	15
Germany	•	•	•	•	•	•	•	•	•	10th	•	•	•	13th	•	13th	8th	•	•	4
Greece	•	•	5th	•	2nd	•	•	•	•	•	•	7th	•	•	•	•	•	•	•	3
Guatemala	•	•	•	•	•	•	•	•	•	•	•	•	•	•	•	•	19th	•	•	1
India	•	•	•	•	•	•	•	2nd	9th	8th	7th	•	•	•	•	•	10th	17th	•	6
Iran	4th	•	•	•	9th	•	2nd	3rd	5th	1st	2nd	10th	4th	3rd	1st	5th	3rd	2nd	4th	15
Italy	•	•	•	2nd	1st	•	13th	9th	3rd	•	8th	•	•	5th	9th	1st	6th	7th	5th	12
Japan	7th	6th	2nd	3rd	3rd	9th	•	•	•	•	14th	•	17th	15th	3rd	6th	•	11th	16th	13
Mexico	•	•	•	•	•	13th	13th	•	13th	12th	•	•	14th	14th	18th	18th	•	12th	•	9
Morocco	•	•	•	•	•	•	•	13th	•	•	•	•	•	•	•	•	•	•	•	1
Netherlands	•	•	•	•	•	•	•	9th	•	•	•	•	•	•	•	•	•	•	•	1
Nigeria	•	•	•	•	•	•	•	•	•	•	•	•	•	•	•	14th	14th	20th	•	3
Pakistan	•	•	•	•	•	•	•	•	•	•	•	•	•	•	•	•	•	•	13th	1
Poland	•	•	9th	•	4th	3rd	5th	13th	7th	5th	11th	•	3rd	1st	17th	•	1st	•	2nd	13
Portugal	•	9th	4th	•	•	•	•	•	•	•	•	•	•	•	•	•	•	•	•	2
Puerto Rico	5th	•	6th	4th	•	•	•	7th	•	11th	15th	15th	•	19th	14th	•	•	16th	18th	11
Qatar	11th	•	•	•	•	•	•	•	•	•	•	•	•	•	•	•	•	•	•	1
Russia	2nd	2nd	•	6th	•	1st	3rd	5th	1st	9th	4th	13th	1st	4th	2nd	2nd	4th	•	•	15 (Note: Russia's total includes two appearances as Soviet Union in 1989 and 1991.)
Rwanda	•	•	•	•	•	•	•	•	•	•	•	•	20th	•	•	•	•	•	•	1
Saudi Arabia	•	•	•	•	•	4th	•	•	•	•	•	•	•	•	•	•	•	•	•	1
Serbia	•	•	•	•	•	•	•	•	•	•	1st	1st	•	•	•	•	•	15th	•	3
Slovakia	•	•	•	•	13th	13th	13th	13th	8th	•	•	•	•	•	•	•	•	•	•	5
Slovenia	•	•	•	•	•	•	•	•	•	•	•	•	•	•	•	•	•	10th	•	1
South Korea	5th	3rd	3rd	•	9th	6th	6th	•	9th	•	•	14th	10th	•	4th	11th	•	3rd	8th	13
Spain	•	•	•	9th	•	•	•	•	•	•	5th	2nd	•	•	•	•	•	•	3rd	4
Sudan	•	•	•	•	•	•	13th	•	•	•	•	•	•	•	•	•	•	•	•	1
Thailand	•	•	•	•	•	•	•	6th	•	•	•	•	•	•	•	•	13th	•	•	2
Tunisia	•	•	•	11th	9th	9th	8th	•	13th	14th	6th	16th	18th	•	20th	17th	•	•	22nd	12
Turkey	•	•	9th	•	•	•	•	•	•	•	•	•	15th	9th	11th	•	•	•	20th	5
Ukraine	•	•	•	•	•	5th	•	•	•	•	•	•	•	•	•	•	•	•	•	1
United Arab Emirates	11th	•	•	•	•	•	•	•	•	•	•	•	•	•	•	•	•	•	•	1
United States	•	•	•	7th	•	•	•	•	•	15th	10th	11th	16th	7th	15th	15th	•	4th	15th	10
Uzbekistan	•	•	•	•	•	•	•	•	•	•	•	•	•	•	•	•	•	•	14th	1
Venezuela	•	•	•	•	13th	2nd	9th	13th	•	•	•	•	•	•	•	•	•	•	•	4

== Most valuable player by edition ==
- 1989–91 – Not awarded
- 1993 – Giba (BRA)
- 1995 – Not awarded
- 1997 – Daniele Desiderio (ITA)
- 1999 – Not awarded
- 2001 – Mohammad Soleimani (IRI)
- 2003 – Not awarded
- 2005 – Anton Fomenko (RUS)
- 2007 – Mojtaba Ghiasi (IRI)
- 2009 – Aleksandar Atanasijević (SRB)
- 2011 – Uroš Kovačević (SRB)
- 2013 – Pavel Pankov (RUS)
- 2015 – Bartosz Kwolek (POL)
- 2017 – Amir Hossein Esfandiar (IRI)
- 2019 – Tommaso Rinaldi (ITA)
- 2021 – Tytus Nowik (POL)
- 2023 – Mathis Henno (FRA)
- 2025 – Andrej Jokanovic (FRA)

== See also ==
- FIVB Volleyball Girls' U19 World Championship
- FIVB Volleyball Men's U21 World Championship
- FIVB Volleyball Men's U23 World Championship
- FIVB Volleyball Men's World Championship
