= 2005 FIVB Volleyball Boys' U19 World Championship =

2005 Boys' U19 World Championship

Tournament details
- Host country: Algeria
- Dates: 24 August – 1 September
- Teams: 16
- Venues: 2 (in 2 host cities)

Final positions
- Champions: Russia (2nd title)

Tournament awards
- MVP: (Russia) Anton Fomenko

The 2005 FIVB Volleyball Boys' U19 World Championship (Arabic: بطولة العالم للكرة الطائرة ناشئين 2005) was held in Algiers and Oran, Algeria, from 24 August to 1 September 2005.

== Qualification ==
Confederation	Method of Qualification	Date	Venue	Vacancies	Qualified
	Host			1	Algeria
CAVB	2004 African Youth Championship		(South Africa) Durban	2	Egypt; Tunisia
AVC	2005 Asian Youth Championship	13–19 May 2005	(Iran) Tehran	3	India; Iran; South Korea
NORCECA	2004 NORCECA Youth Championship		Mexico	2	Canada; Mexico
CSV	2004 South American Youth Championship		(Colombia) Bogotá	2	Argentina; Brazil
CEV	2005 European Youth Championship		(Latvia) Riga	6	Bulgaria; France; Italy; Poland; Russia; Slovakia
Total				16	

== Venues ==
Algiers	Locations of the championship venues	Oran
Hacène Harcha Arena	Locations of the championship venues	Hamou Boutlélis Sports Palace
Capacity: 6,000	Locations of the championship venues	Capacity: 5,000

== Preliminary round ==
All times are local (UTC+1).

=== Pool A ===
Pos	Team	Pld	W	L	Pts	SW	SL	SR	SPW	SPL	SPR	Qualification
1	Slovakia	3	3	0	9	9	3	3.000	277	250	1.108	Seeding group
2	South Korea	3	2	1	6	6	3	2.000	219	199	1.101	Elimination group
3	Egypt	3	1	2	3	5	8	0.625	270	278	0.971	Elimination group
4	Algeria	3	0	3	0	3	9	0.333	248	287	0.864	

Date	Time	Venue		Score		Set 1	Set 2	Set 3	Set 4	Set 5	Total	Report
24 Aug	16:00	Algiers	Algeria	2–3	Egypt	25–18	18–25	25–23	25–27	6–15	99–108	99–108
24 Aug	18:00	Algiers	South Korea	0–3	Slovakia	23–25	18–25	22–25			63–75	63–75
25 Aug	16:00	Algiers	Slovakia	3–1	Algeria	25–23	22–25	25–16	25–17		97–81	98–80
25 Aug	18:30	Algiers	South Korea	3–0	Egypt	25–12	25–22	25–21			75–55	75–55
26 Aug	16:00	Algiers	Algeria	0–3	South Korea	20–25	29–31	20–25			69–81	69–81
26 Aug	18:00	Algiers	Egypt	2–3	Slovakia	25–18	23–25	22–25	25–21	12–15	107–104	107–104

=== Pool B ===
Pos	Team	Pld	W	L	Pts	SW	SL	SR	SPW	SPL	SPR	Qualification
1	Brazil	3	3	0	9	9	2	4.500	253	202	1.252	Seeding group
2	Argentina	3	2	1	6	6	4	1.500	228	216	1.056	Elimination group
3	Bulgaria	3	1	2	3	5	6	0.833	226	178	1.270	Elimination group
4	Mexico	3	0	3	0	1	9	0.111	136	247	0.551	

Date	Time	Venue		Score		Set 1	Set 2	Set 3	Set 4	Set 5	Total	Report
24 Aug	9:00	Algiers	Mexico	0–3	Bulgaria	0–25	0–25	0–25			0–75	0–75
24 Aug	11:00	Algiers	Argentina	0–3	Brazil	20–25	15–25	21–25			56–75	56–75
25 Aug	9:00	Algiers	Argentina	3–1	Mexico	25–22	22–25	25–15	25–19		97–81	97–81
25 Aug	11:15	Algiers	Brazil	3–2	Bulgaria	21–25	25–19	25–11	17–25	15–11	103–91	103–91
26 Aug	9:00	Algiers	Bulgaria	0–3	Argentina	23–25	20–25	17–25			60–75	60–75
26 Aug	11:00	Algiers	Mexico	0–3	Brazil	20–25	16–25	19–25			55–75	55–75

=== Pool C ===
Pos	Team	Pld	W	L	Pts	SW	SL	SR	SPW	SPL	SPR	Qualification
1	Italy	3	2	1	6	7	4	1.750	253	230	1.100	Seeding group
2	Poland	3	2	1	6	7	5	1.400	264	243	1.086	Elimination group
3	India	3	2	1	6	8	4	2.000	262	253	1.036	Elimination group
4	Canada	3	0	3	0	0	9	0.000	173	226	0.765	

Date	Time	Venue		Score		Set 1	Set 2	Set 3	Set 4	Set 5	Total	Report
24 Aug	9:00	Oran	Poland	3–2	India	25–22	25–19	20–25	23–25	15–7	108–98	108–98
24 Aug	11:30	Oran	Italy	3–0	Canada	25–19	25–20	25–22			75–61	75–61
25 Aug	9:00	Oran	India	3–0	Canada	25–21	25–18	25–20			75–59	75–59
25 Aug	11:00	Oran	Poland	1–3	Italy	20–25	25–17	16–25	19–25		80–92	80–92
26 Aug	9:00	Oran	Italy	1–3	India	25–14	17–25	23–25	21–25		86–89	86–89
26 Aug	11:05	Oran	Canada	0–3	Poland	11–25	24–25	18–25			53–75	53–76

=== Pool D ===
Pos	Team	Pld	W	L	Pts	SW	SL	SR	SPW	SPL	SPR	Qualification
1	France	3	3	0	9	9	1	9.000	245	203	1.207	Seeding group
2	Russia	3	2	1	6	7	3	2.333	237	198	1.197	Elimination group
3	Iran	3	1	2	3	3	8	0.375	217	151	1.437	Elimination group
4	Tunisia	3	0	3	0	2	9	0.222	206	253	0.814	

Date	Time	Venue		Score		Set 1	Set 2	Set 3	Set 4	Set 5	Total	Report
24 Aug	16:00	Oran	France	3–0	Tunisia	25–19	25–17	25–20			75–56	75–56
24 Aug	18:00	Oran	Iran	0–3	Russia	16–25	17–25	21–25			54–75	54–75
25 Aug	16:00	Oran	Tunisia	0–3	Russia	17–25	16–25	16–25			49–75	49–75
25 Aug	18:00	Oran	France	3–0	Iran	25–19	25–22	25–19			75–60	75–60
26 Aug	16:05	Oran	Iran	3–2	Tunisia	18–25	26–24	19–25	25–14	15–13	103–101	103–101
26 Aug	18:45	Oran	Russia	1–3	France	21–25	19–25	25–20	22–25		87–95	87–95

== Final round ==
=== Pool E - Play-off (Seeding Group) ===
Date	Time	Venue		Score		Set 1	Set 2	Set 3	Set 4	Set 5	Total	Report
28 Aug	16:00	Algiers	Slovakia	0–3	Brazil	14–25	17–25	8–25			39–75	39–75
28 Aug	18:00	Algiers	Italy	2–3	France	22–25	25–23	17–25	25–16	12–15	101–104	101–104

=== Pool F - Play-off (Elimination Group) ===
Date	Time	Venue		Score		Set 1	Set 2	Set 3	Set 4	Set 5	Total	Report
28 Aug	16:00	Oran	Bulgaria	0–3	Russia	22–25	16–25	19–25			57–75	57–75
28 Aug	18:00	Oran	Poland	3–0	Egypt	25–18	27–25	25–21			77–64	77–64
28 Aug	9:00	Algiers	India	1–3	Argentina	18–25	25–22	23–25	26–28		92–100	92–100
28 Aug	11:00	Algiers	South Korea	0–3	Iran	20–25	19–25	23–25			62–75	62–75

=== Championship bracket ===
Quarter finals
30 August – Algiers
Slovakia	0
Russia	3
30 August – Algiers
Argentina	3
France	2
30 August – Algiers
Brazil	3
Poland	0
30 August – Algiers
Iran	2
Italy	3

Semi finals
31 August – Algiers
Russia	3
Argentina	0
31 August – Algiers
Brazil	3
Italy	1

Final
1 Septembre – Algiers
Brazil	2
Russia	3
Third place
1 Septembre – Algiers
Italy	3
Argentina	1

=== 5th–8th places bracket ===
5th–8th semifinals
31 August – Algiers
Poland	0
Iran	3
31 August – Algiers
Slovakia	1
France	3

5th place
1 Septembre – Algiers
Iran	3
France	1
7th place
1 Septembre – Algiers
Poland	3
Slovakia	0

=== Quarterfinals ===
Date	Time	Venue		Score		Set 1	Set 2	Set 3	Set 4	Set 5	Total	Report
30 Aug	9:00	Algiers	Iran	2–3	Italy	18–25	25–22	17–25	25–18	12–15	97–105	97–105
30 Aug	11:00	Algiers	Argentina	3–2	France	23–25	23–25	25–15	25–18	20–18	116–101	116–101
30 Aug	16:00	Algiers	Brazil	3–0	Poland	25–21	25–19	29–27			79–67	79–67
30 Aug	18:00	Algiers	Slovakia	0–3	Russia	19–25	19–25	23–25			61–75	61–75

=== 5th–8th semifinals ===
Date	Time	Venue		Score		Set 1	Set 2	Set 3	Set 4	Set 5	Total	Report
31 Aug	9:00	Algiers	Poland	0–3	Iran	21–25	17–25	19–25			57–75	57–75
31 Aug	11:00	Algiers	Slovakia	1–3	France	25–15	16–25	18–25	22–25		81–90	81–90

=== Semifinals ===
Date	Time	Venue		Score		Set 1	Set 2	Set 3	Set 4	Set 5	Total	Report
31 Aug	16:00	Algiers	Russia	3–0	Argentina	25–21	25–20	27–25			77–66	77–66
31 Aug	18:00	Algiers	Brazil	3–1	Italy	21–25	25–22	25–22	25–22		96–91	96–89

=== 7th place ===
Date	Time	Venue		Score		Set 1	Set 2	Set 3	Set 4	Set 5	Total	Report
1 Sep	9:00	Algiers	Poland	3–0	Slovakia	31–29	25–20	28–26			84–75	84–75

=== 5th place ===
Date	Time	Venue		Score		Set 1	Set 2	Set 3	Set 4	Set 5	Total	Report
1 Sep	11:00	Algiers	Iran	3–1	France	20–25	25–13	25–19	25–19		95–76	95–76

=== Third place ===
Date	Time	Venue		Score		Set 1	Set 2	Set 3	Set 4	Set 5	Total	Report
1 Sep	19:00	Algiers	Italy	3–1	Argentina	25–21	23–25	25–23	25–17		98–86	98–86

=== Final ===
Date	Time	Venue		Score		Set 1	Set 2	Set 3	Set 4	Set 5	Total	Report
1 Sep	21:00	Algiers	Brazil	2–3	Russia	25–17	22–25	25–17	23–25	11–15	106–99	106–99

== Final standing ==
Final Standings results are given below.

Rank	Team
1st place, gold medalist(s)	Russia
2nd place, silver medalist(s)	Brazil
3rd place, bronze medalist(s)	Italy
4	Argentina
5	Iran
6	France
7	Poland
8	Slovakia
9	Bulgaria
9	Egypt
9	India
9	South Korea
13	Tunisia
13	Canada
13	Mexico
13	Algeria

2005 Boys' U19 World champions

Russia
2nd title

Team Roster

Maxim Mikhaylov, Dmitry Ilinikh, Dmitry Krasikov, Anton Fomenko, Makar Saparov, Oleg Sychev, Konstantin Lesik, Alexander Chefranov, Roman Martynyuk, Nikolay Evtyukhin, Sergey Bagrey, Sergey Andrianov

Head Coach: Vladimir Kondra

== Awards ==
- Most valuable player
  (Russia) Anton Fomenko
- Best Top Scorer
  (France) Nicolas Maréchal
- Best spiker
  (Iran) Mohammad Mousavi
- Best blocker
  (Brazil) Deivid Costa
- Best server
  (Russia) Konstantin Lesik
- Best digger
  (Russia) Roman Martynyuk
- Best setter
  (Slovakia) Juraj Zatko
