= 2013 Boys' Youth European Volleyball Championship =

Tournament details
- Host country: Serbia; Bosnia and Herzegovina
- Dates: 12–21 April
- Teams: 12
- Venues: 2 (in 2 host cities)

Final positions
- Champions: Russia (5th title)

Tournament awards
- MVP: Victor Poletaev (RUS)

The 2013 Boys' Youth European Volleyball Championship. Qualification was played in the Czech Republic, Latvia, Slovakia, Turkey and Hungary from January 3 to 7, 2013. The final round (group round and play-off) was contested between April 12 and 21, 2013. The top six teams qualified for the 2013 Youth World Championship.

== Participating teams ==
- Host
  - Bosnia and Herzegovina
  - Serbia
- Qualified through 2013 Boys' Youth European Volleyball Championship Qualification
  - Austria
  - Belgium
  - Bulgaria
  - Finland
  - France
  - Italy
  - Poland
  - Russia
  - Slovenia
  - Turkey

== Pool composition ==
Pool I	Pool II
Austria	Bulgaria
Bosnia and Herzegovina	Finland
Belgium	France
Italy	Russia
Poland	Serbia
Slovenia	Turkey

== Preliminary round ==
- All times are Daylight Saving Time (UTC+02:00)

=== Pool I ===
- Venue: Laktaši Sports Hall, Laktaši, Bosnia and Herzegovina

Pos	Team	Pld	W	L	Pts	SW	SL	SR	SPW	SPL	SPR	Qualification
1	Poland	5	5	0	15	15	0	MAX	379	271	1.399	Final round
2	Belgium	5	3	2	10	11	8	1.375	413	378	1.093	Final round
3	Italy	5	3	2	9	10	7	1.429	395	360	1.097	5th–8th classification
4	Austria	5	2	3	6	6	11	0.545	359	404	0.889	5th–8th classification
5	Slovenia	5	2	3	5	8	11	0.727	388	421	0.922	
6	Bosnia and Herzegovina	5	0	5	0	2	15	0.133	317	417	0.760	

Date	Time		Score		Set 1	Set 2	Set 3	Set 4	Set 5	Total	Report
13 Apr	15:00	Italy	1–3	Belgium	23–25	19–25	25–20	24–26		91–96	Report
13 Apr	17:30	Poland	3–0	Austria	25–15	25–22	25–19			75–56	Report
13 Apr	20:00	Bosnia and Herzegovina	0–3	Slovenia	13–25	15–25	23–25			51–75	Report
14 Apr	15:00	Belgium	0–3	Poland	12–25	13–25	21–25			46–75	Report
14 Apr	17:30	Italy	3–1	Slovenia	25–18	25–18	15–25	25–23		90–84	Report
14 Apr	20:00	Austria	3–1	Bosnia and Herzegovina	25–20	28–30	25–21	25–22		103–93	Report
15 Apr	15:00	Poland	3–0	Italy	28–26	25–21	25–16			78–63	Report
15 Apr	17:30	Slovenia	1–3	Austria	17–25	25–22	20–25	23–25		85–97	Report
15 Apr	20:00	Bosnia and Herzegovina	1–3	Belgium	16–25	14–25	25–13	13–25		68–88	Report
17 Apr	15:00	Italy	3–0	Austria	26–24	25–17	25–13			76–54	Report
17 Apr	17:30	Belgium	2–3	Slovenia	22–25	24–26	25–15	25–14	12–15	108–95	Report
17 Apr	20:00	Poland	3–0	Bosnia and Herzegovina	26–24	25–21	25–12			76–57	Report
18 Apr	15:00	Austria	0–3	Belgium	14–25	17–25	18–25			49–75	Report
18 Apr	17:30	Slovenia	0–3	Poland	18–25	19–25	12–25			49–75	Report
18 Apr	20:00	Italy	3–0	Bosnia and Herzegovina	25–15	25–17	25–16			75–48	Report

=== Pool II ===
- Venue: SC Šumice, Belgrade, Serbia

Pos	Team	Pld	W	L	Pts	SW	SL	SR	SPW	SPL	SPR	Qualification
1	Russia	5	5	0	15	15	2	7.500	430	307	1.401	Final round
2	Finland	5	3	2	10	11	8	1.375	429	422	1.017	Final round
3	Turkey	5	4	1	9	12	9	1.333	439	417	1.053	5th–8th classification
4	France	5	2	3	6	8	10	0.800	367	418	0.878	5th–8th classification
5	Bulgaria	5	1	4	3	6	14	0.429	408	457	0.893	
6	Serbia	5	0	5	2	6	15	0.400	447	499	0.896	

Date	Time		Score		Set 1	Set 2	Set 3	Set 4	Set 5	Total	Report
12 Apr	15:00	Turkey	0–3	Russia	17–25	20–25	6–25			43–75	Report
12 Apr	17:30	Bulgaria	1–3	France	19–25	23–25	25–21	18–25		85–96	Report
12 Apr	20:00	Serbia	1–3	Finland	26–24	20–25	25–27	24–26		95–102	Report
13 Apr	15:00	Turkey	3–2	Bulgaria	18–25	25–22	25–20	23–25	15–6	106–98	Report
13 Apr	17:30	Russia	3–0	Finland	25–21	25–14	25–11			75–46	Report
13 Apr	20:00	France	3–0	Serbia	25–23	25–22	25–21			75–66	Report
14 Apr	15:00	Bulgaria	0–3	Russia	16–25	18–25	17–25			51–75	Report
14 Apr	17:30	Finland	3–1	France	25–19	19–25	25–13	25–21		94–78	Report
14 Apr	20:00	Serbia	2–3	Turkey	14–25	25–21	16–25	25–19	7–15	87–105	Report
16 Apr	15:00	Russia	3–1	France	25–17	25–14	23–25	25–15		98–71	Report
16 Apr	17:30	Turkey	3–2	Finland	25–22	17–25	35–33	18–25	15–5	110–110	Report
16 Apr	20:00	Bulgaria	3–2	Serbia	25–22	20–25	25–27	25–17	15–12	110–103	Report
17 Apr	15:00	France	0–3	Turkey	19–25	18–25	10–25			47–75	Report
17 Apr	17:30	Finland	3–0	Bulgaria	25–17	25–22	27–25			77–64	Report
17 Apr	20:00	Serbia	1–3	Russia	30–28	16–25	24–26	26–28		96–107	Report

== Final round ==
- All times are Daylight Saving Time (UTC+02:00)
- Venue: Laktaši Sports Hall, Laktaši, Bosnia and Herzegovina

=== 5th to 8th place ===
5th to 8th Classification
2013-04-20 – Laktasi
Italy	2
France	3
2013-04-20 – Laktasi
Turkey	3
Austria	1

5th place match
2013-04-21 – Laktasi
France	1
Turkey	3
7th place match
2013-04-21 – Laktasi
Italy	3
Austria	1

==== 5th–8th place playoff ====
Date	Time		Score		Set 1	Set 2	Set 3	Set 4	Set 5	Total	Report
20 Apr	12:30	Italy	2–3	France	21–25	25–23	20–25	25–22	11–15	102–110	Report
20 Apr	15:00	Turkey	3–1	Austria	27–25	25–18	21–25	26–24		99–92	Report

==== 7th place ====
Date	Time		Score		Set 1	Set 2	Set 3	Set 4	Set 5	Total	Report
21 Apr	12:30	Italy	3–1	Austria	25–12	23–25	25–14	25–13		98–64	Report

==== 5th place ====
Date	Time		Score		Set 1	Set 2	Set 3	Set 4	Set 5	Total	Report
21 Apr	15:00	France	1–3	Turkey	23–25	22–25	25–23	17–25		87–98	Report

=== Final round ===
Semifinal
2013-04-20 – Laktasi
Poland	3
Finland	0
2013-04-20 – Laktasi
Russia	3
Belgium	0

Final
2013-04-21 – Laktasi
Poland	1
Russia	3
3rd place match
2013-04-21 – Laktasi
Finland	2
Belgium	3

==== Semifinal ====
Date	Time		Score		Set 1	Set 2	Set 3	Set 4	Set 5	Total	Report
20 Apr	17:30	Poland	3–0	Finland	25–14	25–23	25–13			75–50	Report
20 Apr	20:00	Russia	3–0	Belgium	25–11	25–23	25–20			75–54	Report

==== 3rd place ====
Date	Time		Score		Set 1	Set 2	Set 3	Set 4	Set 5	Total	Report
21 Apr	17:30	Finland	2–3	Belgium	19–25	25–20	25–22	19–25	10–15	98–107	Report

=== Final ===
Date	Time		Score		Set 1	Set 2	Set 3	Set 4	Set 5	Total	Report
21 Apr	20:00	Poland	1–3	Russia	16–25	18–25	25–22	21–25		80–97	Report

== Final standing ==
Rank	Team
1st place, gold medalist(s)	Russia
2nd place, silver medalist(s)	Poland
3rd place, bronze medalist(s)	Belgium
4	Finland
5	Turkey
6	France
7	Italy
8	Austria
9	Slovenia
10	Bulgaria
11	Serbia
12	Bosnia and Herzegovina

Qualified for the 2013 Youth World Championship

2013 Youth European champions

Russia
5th title

12–man Roster
Evgenii Andreev, Pavel Pankov, Ilia Vlasov, Maxim Troynin, Nikita Vishnevetskiy, Romas Zhos, Kirill Ursov, Victor Poletaev, Maxim Belogordcev, Alexander Goncharov, Nikolai Chepura, Maksim Novgorodov
Head coach
Alexander Karikov

== Individual awards ==
- Most valuable player
  - (Russia) Victor Poletaev
- Best spiker
  - (Poland) Bartosz Bućko
- Best scorer
  - (Poland) Bartosz Bućko
- Best blocker
  - (Russia) Ilia Vlasov
- Best server
  - (Russia) Pavel Pankov
- Best setter
  - (Belgium) Sander Depovere
- Best receiver
  - (Poland) Rafał Szymura
- Best libero
  - (Poland) Kacper Piechocki
