= 2009 FIVB Volleyball Boys' U19 World Championship =

2009 Boys' Youth World Championship

Tournament details
- Host country: Italy
- Dates: 28 August – 6 September
- Teams: 16
- Venues: 2 (in 2 host cities)

Final positions
- Champions: Serbia (1st title)

Tournament awards
- MVP: (Serbia) Aleksandar Atanasijević

The 2009 FIVB Volleyball Boys' Youth World Championship was held in Jesolo and Bassano del Grappa, Italy from 28 August to 6 September 2009. 16 teams participated in the tournament.

== Competing nations ==
The following national teams have qualified:

Pool A	Pool B	Pool C	Pool D
Italy; Tunisia; Puerto Rico; Egypt	Iran; United States; Serbia; Japan	Argentina; France; Spain; Algeria	Brazil; Russia; Poland; India

== Venues ==
- Palazzo del Turismo (Jesolo) – Pool B, D, E, F
- Palasport Bassano (Bassano del Grappa) – Pool A, C, G, H

== First round ==
=== Pool A ===
Pos	Team	Pld	W	L	Pts	SW	SL	SR	SPW	SPL	SPR	Qualification
1	Italy	3	3	0	6	9	4	2.250	296	260	1.138	Pool E or Pool F
2	Tunisia	3	2	1	5	8	5	1.600	293	264	1.110	Pool E or Pool F
3	Puerto Rico	3	1	2	4	5	7	0.714	245	277	0.884	Pool G or Pool H
4	Egypt	3	0	3	3	3	9	0.333	252	285	0.884	Pool G or Pool H

Date		Score		Set 1	Set 2	Set 3	Set 4	Set 5	Total
28 Aug	Tunisia	3–1	Puerto Rico	25–11	22–25	25–16	25–14		97–66
28 Aug	Italy	3–1	Egypt	25–18	16–25	25–17	25–19		91–79
29 Aug	Egypt	1–3	Puerto Rico	25–21	22–25	14–25	22–25		83–96
29 Aug	Italy	3–2	Tunisia	25–17	20–25	25–18	23–25	15–13	108–98
30 Aug	Tunisia	3–1	Egypt	25–22	23–25	25–23	25–20		98–90
30 Aug	Puerto Rico	1–3	Italy	19–25	25–22	19–25	20–25		83–97

=== Pool B ===
Pos	Team	Pld	W	L	Pts	SW	SL	SR	SPW	SPL	SPR	Qualification
1	Iran	3	2	1	5	7	4	1.750	259	225	1.151	Pool E or Pool F
2	Serbia	3	2	1	5	6	5	1.200	238	229	1.039	Pool E or Pool F
3	United States	3	2	1	5	6	5	1.200	239	254	0.941	Pool G or Pool H
4	Japan	3	0	3	3	4	9	0.444	271	299	0.906	Pool G or Pool H

Date		Score		Set 1	Set 2	Set 3	Set 4	Set 5	Total
28 Aug	Japan	2–3	Serbia	25–20	17–25	25–22	21–25	13–15	101–107
28 Aug	Iran	1–3	United States	20–25	25–13	22–25	23–25		90–88
29 Aug	Iran	3–1	Japan	25–20	25–18	19–25	25–18		94–81
29 Aug	United States	0–3	Serbia	17–25	18–25	18–25			53–75
30 Aug	United States	3–1	Japan	25–21	23–25	25–21	25–22		98–89
30 Aug	Serbia	0–3	Iran	22–25	11–25	23–25			56–75

=== Pool C ===
Pos	Team	Pld	W	L	Pts	SW	SL	SR	SPW	SPL	SPR	Qualification
1	Argentina	3	3	0	6	9	3	3.000	284	251	1.131	Pool E or Pool F
2	Spain	3	2	1	5	7	3	2.333	245	204	1.201	Pool E or Pool F
3	France	3	1	2	4	5	7	0.714	248	259	0.958	Pool G or Pool H
4	Algeria	3	0	3	3	1	9	0.111	190	253	0.751	Pool G or Pool H

Date		Score		Set 1	Set 2	Set 3	Set 4	Set 5	Total
28 Aug	Algeria	0–3	Spain	12–25	18–25	16–25			46–75
28 Aug	Argentina	3–2	France	14–25	25–21	25–16	23–25	15–7	102–94
29 Aug	Argentina	3–0	Algeria	25–16	25–20	28–26			78–62
29 Aug	France	0–3	Spain	16–25	20–25	18–25			54–75
30 Aug	France	3–1	Algeria	23–25	27–25	25–16	25–16		100–82
30 Aug	Spain	1–3	Argentina	30–28	19–25	24–26	22–25		95–104

=== Pool D ===
Pos	Team	Pld	W	L	Pts	SW	SL	SR	SPW	SPL	SPR	Qualification
1	Russia	3	3	0	6	9	1	9.000	246	198	1.242	Pool E or Pool F
2	India	3	2	1	5	6	7	0.857	258	289	0.893	Pool E or Pool F
3	Brazil	3	1	2	4	5	7	0.714	276	269	1.026	Pool G or Pool H
4	Poland	3	0	3	3	4	9	0.444	273	297	0.919	Pool G or Pool H

Date		Score		Set 1	Set 2	Set 3	Set 4	Set 5	Total
28 Aug	India	3–2	Poland	18–25	26–24	25–18	18–25	15–13	102–105
28 Aug	Brazil	0–3	Russia	22–25	23–25	23–25			68–75
29 Aug	Brazil	2–3	India	25–19	23–25	25–20	24–26	12–15	109–105
29 Aug	Russia	3–1	Poland	25–20	25–23	21–25	25–11		96–79
30 Aug	Russia	3–0	India	25–20	25–18	25–13			75–51
30 Aug	Poland	1–3	Brazil	21–25	23–25	26–24	19–25		89–99

== Second round ==
=== Pool E ===
Pos	Team	Pld	W	L	Pts	SW	SL	SR	SPW	SPL	SPR	Qualification
1	Serbia	3	2	1	5	8	3	2.667	254	221	1.149	Semifinals
2	Argentina	3	2	1	5	8	7	1.143	310	305	1.016	Semifinals
3	India	3	1	2	4	5	7	0.714	248	265	0.936	5th–8th place
4	Italy	3	1	2	4	4	8	0.500	246	267	0.921	5th–8th place

Date		Score		Set 1	Set 2	Set 3	Set 4	Set 5	Total
01 Sep	Serbia	2–3	Argentina	25–23	23–25	25–23	21–25	10–15	104–111
01 Sep	Italy	1–3	India	25–21	23–25	19–25	20–25		87–96
02 Sep	India	2–3	Argentina	12–25	25–16	26–28	25–19	12–15	100–103
02 Sep	Italy	0–3	Serbia	21–25	23–25	14–25			58–75
03 Sep	Serbia	3–0	India	25–17	25–14	25–21			75–52
03 Sep	Argentina	2–3	Italy	16–25	25–23	20–25	25–13	10–15	96–101

=== Pool F ===
Pos	Team	Pld	W	L	Pts	SW	SL	SR	SPW	SPL	SPR	Qualification
1	Iran	3	3	0	6	9	2	4.500	263	200	1.315	Semifinals
2	Russia	3	2	1	5	6	4	1.500	227	218	1.041	Semifinals
3	Tunisia	3	1	2	4	4	8	0.500	231	279	0.828	5th–8th place
4	Spain	3	0	3	3	4	9	0.444	267	291	0.918	5th–8th place

Date		Score		Set 1	Set 2	Set 3	Set 4	Set 5	Total
01 Sep	Iran	3–1	Spain	25–15	25–17	17–25	25–17		92–74
01 Sep	Tunisia	0–3	Russia	18–25	20–25	20–25			58–75
02 Sep	Spain	1–3	Russia	24–26	13–25	25–22	23–25		85–98
02 Sep	Iran	3–1	Tunisia	25–16	21–25	25–18	25–13		96–72
03 Sep	Russia	0–3	Iran	19–25	17–25	18–25			54–75
03 Sep	Tunisia	3–2	Spain	25–21	19–25	25–23	16–25	16–14	101–108

=== Pool G ===
Pos	Team	Pld	W	L	Pts	SW	SL	SR	SPW	SPL	SPR	Qualification
1	Poland	3	2	1	5	8	4	2.000	275	240	1.146	9th–12th place
2	France	3	2	1	5	6	6	1.000	259	258	1.004	9th–12th place
3	Japan	3	1	2	4	6	6	1.000	271	261	1.038	13th–16th place
4	Puerto Rico	3	1	2	4	4	8	0.500	234	280	0.836	13th–16th place

Date		Score		Set 1	Set 2	Set 3	Set 4	Set 5	Total
01 Sep	Japan	3–0	France	25–22	25–15	26–24			76–61
01 Sep	Puerto Rico	0–3	Poland	18–25	13–25	21–25			52–75
02 Sep	Poland	2–3	France	25–16	25–21	22–25	18–25	9–15	99–102
02 Sep	Puerto Rico	3–2	Japan	17–25	25–22	16–25	26–24	15–13	99–109
03 Sep	Japan	1–3	Poland	25–27	26–24	21–25	14–25		86–101
03 Sep	France	3–1	Puerto Rico	25–23	25–17	21–25	25–18		96–83

=== Pool H ===
Pos	Team	Pld	W	L	Pts	SW	SL	SR	SPW	SPL	SPR	Qualification
1	Brazil	3	3	0	6	9	2	4.500	269	233	1.155	9th–12th place
2	United States	3	2	1	5	7	5	1.400	276	242	1.140	9th–12th place
3	Egypt	3	1	2	4	3	6	0.500	192	209	0.919	13th–16th place
4	Algeria	3	0	3	3	3	9	0.333	226	279	0.810	13th–16th place

Date		Score		Set 1	Set 2	Set 3	Set 4	Set 5	Total
01 Sep	United States	3–2	Algeria	25–17	22–25	25–17	20–25	15–6	107–90
01 Sep	Egypt	0–3	Brazil	20–25	20–25	22–25			62–75
02 Sep	Algeria	1–3	Brazil	16–25	22–25	25–22	14–25		77–97
02 Sep	United States	3–0	Egypt	25–21	25–16	25–18			75–55
03 Sep	Brazil	3–1	United States	22–25	25–23	25–23	25–23		97–94
03 Sep	Egypt	3–0	Algeria	25–16	25–21	25–22			75–59

== Final round ==
=== Classification 13th–16th ===
13th–16th places
4 September – Bassano del Grappa
Japan	3
Algeria	0
4 September – Bassano del Grappa
Egypt	3
Puerto Rico	1

13th place
5 September – Bassano del Grappa
Japan	1
Egypt	3
15th place
5 September – Bassano del Grappa
Algeria	0
Puerto Rico	3

Date		Score		Set 1	Set 2	Set 3	Set 4	Set 5	Total
04 Sep	Japan	3–0	Algeria	26–24	33–31	25–12			84–67
04 Sep	Egypt	3–1	Puerto Rico	25–15	25–22	22–25	25–21		97–83

Date		Score		Set 1	Set 2	Set 3	Set 4	Set 5	Total
05 Sep	Algeria	0–3	Puerto Rico	23–25	20–25	22–25			65–75
05 Sep	Japan	1–3	Egypt	22–25	25–18	22–25	20–25		89–93

=== Classification 9th–12th ===
9th–12th places
4 September – Bassano del Grappa
Poland	0
United States	3
4 September – Bassano del Grappa
Brazil	3
France	1

9th place
5 September – Bassano del Grappa
United States	1
Brazil	3
11th place
5 September – Bassano del Grappa
Poland	3
France	2

Date		Score		Set 1	Set 2	Set 3	Set 4	Set 5	Total
04 Sep	Poland	0–3	United States	22–25	18–25	17–25			57–75
04 Sep	Brazil	3–1	France	22–25	25–16	25–13	25–15		97–69

Date		Score		Set 1	Set 2	Set 3	Set 4	Set 5	Total
05 Sep	Poland	3–2	France	25–21	20–25	12–25	25–19	15–8	97–98
05 Sep	United States	1–3	Brazil	25–27	19–25	27–25	19–25		90–102

=== Classification 5th–8th ===
5th–8th places
5 September – Jesolo
India	2
Spain	3
5 September – Jesolo
Tunisia	3
Italy	1

5th place
6 September – Jesolo
Spain	3
Tunisia	1
7th place
6 September – Jesolo
India	3
Italy	1

Date		Score		Set 1	Set 2	Set 3	Set 4	Set 5	Total
05 Sep	India	2–3	Spain	21–25	19–25	25–21	25–16	11–15	101–102
05 Sep	Tunisia	3–1	Italy	24–26	25–20	25–18	25–15		99–79

Date		Score		Set 1	Set 2	Set 3	Set 4	Set 5	Total
06 Sep	India	3–1	Italy	26–28	25–23	25–21	25–16		101–88
06 Sep	Spain	3–1	Tunisia	25–15	25–15	23–25	25–18		98–73

=== Championship ===
Semifinals
5 September – Jesolo
Serbia	3
Russia	0
5 September – Jesolo
Iran	3
Argentina	0

Final
6 September – Jesolo
Serbia	3
Iran	2
3rd place
6 September – Jesolo
Russia	0
Argentina	3

Date		Score		Set 1	Set 2	Set 3	Set 4	Set 5	Total
05 Sep	Serbia	3–0	Russia	25–20	25–22	25–22			75–64
05 Sep	Iran	3–0	Argentina	25–18	25–23	25–22			75–63

Date		Score		Set 1	Set 2	Set 3	Set 4	Set 5	Total
06 Sep	Russia	0–3	Argentina	22–25	28–30	22–25			72–80
06 Sep	Serbia	3–2	Iran	25–22	20–25	17–25	25–20	15–11	102–103

== Final standing ==
Rank	Team
1st place, gold medalist(s)	Serbia
2nd place, silver medalist(s)	Iran
3rd place, bronze medalist(s)	Argentina
4	Russia
5	Spain
6	Tunisia
7	India
8	Italy
9	Brazil
10	United States
11	Poland
12	France
13	Egypt
14	Japan
15	Puerto Rico
16	Algeria

2009 Boys' Youth World champions

Serbia
1st title

Team Roster
Uroš Kovačević, Milan Perić, Maksim Buculjević, Nikola Jovović, Siniša Žarković, Vuk Milutinović, Dušan Petković, Milija Mrdak, Bojan Rajković, Nemanja Opačić, Aleksandar Atanasijević, Čedomir Stanković
Head Coach: Milan Đuričić

== Awards ==
- MVP: (Serbia) Aleksandar Atanasijević
- Best scorer: (Italy) Luca Vettori
- Best spiker: (Japan) Masahiro Yanagida
- Best blocker: (Argentina) Sebastián Sole
- Best server: (Algeria) Ahmed Kerboua
- Best digger: (Tunisia) Saddem Hmissi
- Best receiver: (Brazil) Ricardo Lucarelli Souza
- Best libero: (Spain) Antoni Llabrés
