= 1991 FIVB Volleyball Boys' U19 World Championship =

1989 Boys' U19 World Championship
Tournament details
- Host country: Portugal
- Dates: 7–14 December 1991
- Teams: 12
- Venue: 1 (in 1 host city)

Final positions
- Champions: Brazil (2nd title)

The 1991 FIVB Volleyball Boys' U19 World Championship was held in Porto, Portugal for eight days, from 07 to 14 December 1991. This was the second edition of the tournament.

== Competition formula ==
The 12 teams were divided into two pools of six teams each and played a round-robin tournament. The top two teams of each pool progressed to the semifinals.

== Pools composition ==
Pool A	Pool B
Portugal (Hosts)	Algeria
Argentina	Brazil
Bahrain	Bulgaria
France	Cuba
South Korea	Czechoslovakia
Soviet Union	Japan

== Final round ==
=== 1st–4th places ===
Semifinals
13 December
Soviet Union	3
Czechoslovakia	0
13 December
Brazil	3
South Korea	0

Final
14 December
Soviet Union	1
Brazil	3
3rd place match
14 December
Czechoslovakia	1
South Korea	3

==== Semifinals ====
Date	Time		Score		Set 1	Set 2	Set 3	Set 4	Set 5	Total	Report
13 Dec		Soviet Union	3–0	Czechoslovakia	–	–	–			0–0	
13 Dec		Brazil	3–0	South Korea	–	–	–			0–0	

==== 3rd place match ====
Date	Time		Score		Set 1	Set 2	Set 3	Set 4	Set 5	Total	Report
14 Dec		Czechoslovakia	1–3	South Korea	10–15	15–10	7–15	12–15		44–55	

==== Final ====
Date	Time		Score		Set 1	Set 2	Set 3	Set 4	Set 5	Total	Report
14 Dec		Soviet Union	1–3	Brazil	15–5	15–17	8–15	13–15		51–52	

== Final standing ==
Rank	Team
1st place, gold medalist(s)	Brazil
2nd place, silver medalist(s)	Soviet Union
3rd place, bronze medalist(s)	South Korea
4	Czechoslovakia
5	Argentina
6	Japan
7	France
8	Bulgaria
9	Portugal
10	Cuba
11	Bahrain
12	Algeria

1989 Boys' U19 World champions

Brazil
2nd title

== See also ==
- 1991 FIVB Girls' U18 World Championship
