= Italy at the 2024 Summer Olympics =

- IOC code: ITA
- NOC: Italian National Olympic Committee
- Website: www.coni.it (in Italian)

in Paris, France 26 July 2024 – 11 August 2024
- Competitors: 402 (208 men and 194 women) in 30 sports
- Flag bearers (opening): Gianmarco Tamberi & Arianna Errigo
- Flag bearers (closing): Gregorio Paltrinieri & Rossella Fiamingo
- Officials: Carlo Mornati (chef de mission)
- Medals Ranked 9th: Gold 12 Silver 13 Bronze 15 Total 40

Summer Olympics appearances (overview)
- 1896; 1900; 1904; 1908; 1912; 1920; 1924; 1928; 1932; 1936; 1948; 1952; 1956; 1960; 1964; 1968; 1972; 1976; 1980; 1984; 1988; 1992; 1996; 2000; 2004; 2008; 2012; 2016; 2020; 2024; 2028

Other related appearances
- 1906 Intercalated Games

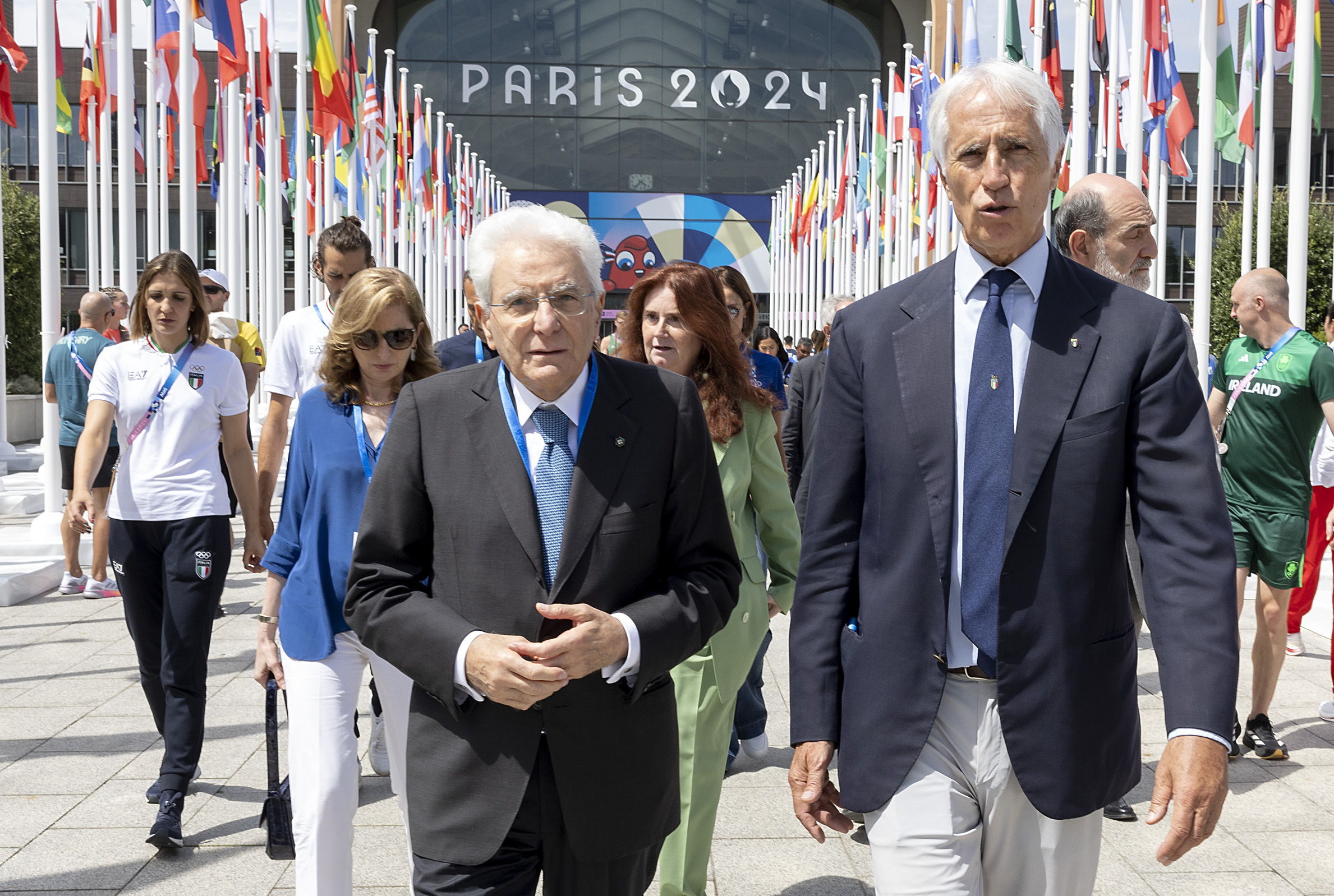
The President of the Italian Republic Mattarella and the President of CONI Malagò in Paris 2024

Italy competed at the 2024 Summer Olympics in Paris from 26 July to 11 August 2024. Italian athletes have appeared in every Summer Olympics edition of the modern era, with the disputed exception of the 1904 edition in which one Italian may have competed.

The opening ceremony flag-bearers for Italy were Gianmarco Tamberi and Arianna Errigo, while the flag bearers for the closing ceremony were Gregorio Paltrinieri and Rossella Fiamingo.

== Medalists ==
Medal	Name	Sport	Event	Date
Gold	Nicolò Martinenghi	Swimming	Men's 100 m breaststroke	28 July
Gold	Thomas Ceccon	Swimming	Men's 100 m backstroke	29 July
Gold	Rossella Fiamingo; Giulia Rizzi; Alberta Santuccio; Mara Navarria	Fencing	Women's team épée	30 July
Gold	Giovanni De Gennaro	Canoeing	Men's slalom K-1	1 August
Gold	Alice Bellandi	Judo	Women's 78 kg	1 August
Gold	Marta Maggetti	Sailing	Women's IQFoil	3 August
Gold	Sara Errani; Jasmine Paolini	Tennis	Women's doubles	4 August
Gold	Alice D'Amato	Gymnastics	Women's balance beam	5 August
Gold	Gabriele Rossetti; Diana Bacosi	Shooting	Mixed skeet team	5 August
Gold	Ruggero Tita; Caterina Banti	Sailing	Mixed Nacra 17	8 August
Gold	Chiara Consonni; Vittoria Guazzini	Cycling	Women's madison	9 August
Gold	Italy women's national volleyball team: Ekaterina Antropova; Caterina Bosetti; Carlotta Cambi; Anna Danesi; Monica De Gennaro; Paola Egonu; Sarah Luisa Fahr; Gaia Giovannini; Marina Lubian; Loveth Omoruyi; Alessia Orro; Myriam Sylla; Ilaria Spirito	Volleyball	Women's tournament	11 August
Silver	Filippo Ganna	Cycling	Men's road time trial	27 July
Silver	Federico Nilo Maldini	Shooting	Men's 10 m air pistol	28 July
Silver	Filippo Macchi	Fencing	Men's foil	29 July
Silver	Angela Andreoli; Alice D'Amato; Manila Esposito; Elisa Iorio; Giorgia Villa	Gymnastics	Women's artistic team all-around	30 July
Silver	Luca Chiumento; Luca Rambaldi; Giacomo Gentili; Andrea Panizza	Rowing	Men's quadruple sculls	31 July
Silver	Silvana Stanco	Shooting	Women's trap	31 July
Silver	Arianna Errigo; Martina Favaretto; Francesca Palumbo; Alice Volpi	Fencing	Women's team foil	1 August
Silver	Stefano Oppo; Gabriel Soares	Rowing	Men's lightweight double sculls	2 August
Silver	Gregorio Paltrinieri	Swimming	Men's 1500 m freestyle	4 August
Silver	Guillaume Bianchi; Alessio Foconi; Filippo Macchi; Tommaso Marini	Fencing	Men's team foil	4 August
Silver	Gabriele Casadei; Carlo Tacchini	Canoeing	Men's C-2 500 m	8 August
Silver	Nadia Battocletti	Athletics	Women's 10,000 m	9 August
Silver	Simone Consonni; Elia Viviani	Cycling	Men's madison	10 August
Bronze	Luigi Samele	Fencing	Men's sabre	27 July
Bronze	Alessandro Miressi; Thomas Ceccon; Paolo Conte Bonin; Manuel Frigo; Leonardo Deplano; Lorenzo Zazzeri	Swimming	Men's 4 × 100 m freestyle relay	27 July
Bronze	Paolo Monna	Shooting	Men's 10 m air pistol	28 July
Bronze	Gregorio Paltrinieri	Swimming	Men's 800 m freestyle	30 July
Bronze	Lorenzo Musetti	Tennis	Men's singles	3 August
Bronze	Manila Esposito	Gymnastics	Women's balance beam	5 August
Bronze	Mattia Furlani	Athletics	Men's long jump	6 August
Bronze	Simone Consonni; Filippo Ganna; Francesco Lamon; Jonathan Milan	Cycling	Men's team pursuit	7 August
Bronze	Ginevra Taddeucci	Swimming	Women's 10 km open water	8 August
Bronze	Antonino Pizzolato	Weightlifting	Men's 89 kg	9 August
Bronze	Sofia Raffaeli	Gymnastics	Women's rhythmic individual all-around	9 August
Bronze	Simone Alessio	Taekwondo	Men's 80 kg	9 August
Bronze	Andy Díaz	Athletics	Men's triple jump	9 August
Bronze	Martina Centofanti; Agnese Duranti; Alessia Maurelli; Daniela Mogurean; Laura Paris	Gymnastics	Women's rhythmic group all-around	10 August
Bronze	Giorgio Malan	Modern pentathlon	Men's individual	10 August

Medals by sport
Sport	1st place, gold medalist(s)	2nd place, silver medalist(s)	3rd place, bronze medalist(s)	Total
Swimming	2	1	3	6
Sailing	2	0	0	2
Fencing	1	3	1	5
Cycling	1	2	1	4
Shooting	1	2	1	4
Gymnastics	1	1	3	5
Canoeing	1	1	0	2
Tennis	1	0	1	2
Judo	1	0	0	1
Volleyball	1	0	0	1
Rowing	0	2	0	2
Athletics	0	1	2	3
Weightlifting	0	0	1	1
Taekwondo	0	0	1	1
Modern Pentathlon	0	0	1	1
Total	12	13	15	40

Medals by gender
Gender	1st place, gold medalist(s)	2nd place, silver medalist(s)	3rd place, bronze medalist(s)	Total
Male	3	9	11	23
Female	7	4	4	15
Mixed	2	0	0	2
Total	12	13	15	40

Medals by date
Date	1st place, gold medalist(s)	2nd place, silver medalist(s)	3rd place, bronze medalist(s)	Total
27 July	0	1	2	3
28 July	1	1	1	3
29 July	1	1	0	2
30 July	1	1	1	3
31 July	0	2	0	2
1 August	2	1	0	3
2 August	0	1	0	1
3 August	1	0	1	2
4 August	1	2	0	3
5 August	2	0	1	3
6 August	0	0	1	1
7 August	0	0	1	1
8 August	1	1	1	3
9 August	1	1	4	6
10 August	0	1	2	3
11 August	1	0	0	1
Total	12	13	15	40

Multiple medalists
Name	Sport	1st place, gold medalist(s)	2nd place, silver medalist(s)	3rd place, bronze medalist(s)	Total
Alice D'Amato	Gymnastics	1	1	0	2
Thomas Ceccon	Swimming	1	0	1	2
Filippo Macchi	Fencing	0	2	0	2
Manila Esposito	Gymnastics	0	1	1	2
Gregorio Paltrinieri	Swimming	0	1	1	2
Filippo Ganna	Cycling	0	1	1	2
Simone Consonni	Cycling	0	1	1	2

== Competitors ==
The following is the list of number of competitors in the Games.

Sport	Men	Women	Total
Archery	3	1	4
Artistic swimming	0	9	9
Athletics	42	40	82
Badminton	1	0	1
Boxing	3	5	8
Breaking	0	1	1
Canoeing	5	2	7
Cycling	12	13	25
Diving	4	4	8
Equestrian	4	1	5
Fencing	12	12	24
Golf	2	1	3
Gymnastics	5	12	17
Judo	6	7	13
Modern pentathlon	2	2	4
Rowing	25	12	37
Sailing	5	7	12
Shooting	10	5	15
Skateboarding	2	0	2
Sport climbing	1	3	4
Surfing	1	0	1
Swimming	22	18	40
Table tennis	0	2	2
Taekwondo	2	1	3
Tennis	5	4	9
Triathlon	2	3	5
Volleyball	17	15	32
Water polo	13	13	26
Weightlifting	2	1	3
Wrestling	1	1	2
Total	208	194	402

== Archery ==
Four Italian archers (three men's and one women's) qualified the recurve events; one women's qualified by winning a bronze medal and obtaining the last of two available spots as the highest-ranked eligible nation at the 2023 European Games in Kraków, Poland; and the men's team recurve qualified for the games through the 2024 European Archery Championships in Essen, Germany.

Athlete	Event	Ranking round		Round of 64	Round of 32	Round of 16	Quarterfinals	Semifinals	Final / BM	
Athlete	Event	Score	Seed	Opposition Score	Opposition Score	Opposition Score	Opposition Score	Opposition Score	Opposition Score	Rank
Federico Musolesi	Men's individual	662	34	Ravnikar (SLO); W 6–4	Kim J-d (KOR); L 4–6	Did not advance				17
Mauro Nespoli	Men's individual	670	20	Islam (BAN); W 6–0	Sadikov (UZB); W 6–4	Peters (CAN); W 6–2	Lee (KOR); L 4–6	Did not advance		6
Alessandro Paoli	Men's individual	658	37	Dorji (BHU); W 7–3	Lee (KOR); L 0–6	Did not advance				17
Federico Musolesi; Mauro Nespoli; Alessandro Paoli	Men's team	1990	7	—N/a		Kazakhstan; W 5–4	France; L 2–6	Did not advance		6
Chiara Rebagliati	Women's individual	663	15	Zairi (MAS); W 6–5	Amăistroaie (ROU); L 3–7	Did not advance				9
Mauro Nespoli; Chiara Rebagliati	Mixed team	1333	9 Q	—N/a		France; W 6–0	South Korea; L 2–6	Did not advance		7

== Artistic swimming ==
Italy fielded a squad of eight artistic swimmers to compete in the open team and women's duet events by virtue of the results of the five highest rank open teams, not yet qualified, at the 2024 World Aquatics Championships in Doha, Qatar.

Athlete	Event	Technical routine		Free routine (final)			Acrobatic routine (final)		Rank
Athlete	Event	Points	Rank	Points	Total (technical + free)	Rank	Points	Total (technical+free+acrobatic)	Rank
Linda Cerruti; Lucrezia Ruggiero	Duet	DNS					—N/a		DNS
Linda Cerruti; Marta Iacoacci; Sofia Mastroianni; Enrica Piccoli; Lucrezia Ruggiero; Isotta Sportelli; Giulia Vernice; Francesca Zunino	Team	277.8304	5	326.1500	603.9804	7	241.9866	8	8

== Athletics ==
Italian track and field athletes achieved the entry standards for Paris 2024, either by passing the direct qualifying mark (or time for track and road races) or by world ranking, in the following events (a maximum of 3 athletes each):

76 athletes were selected, 39 men and 37 women.

Key

- Note–Ranks given for track events are within the athlete's heat only
- Q = Qualified for the next round
- q = Qualified for the next round as a fastest loser or, in field events, by position without achieving the qualifying target
- NR = National record
- N/A = Round not applicable for the event
- Bye = Athlete not required to compete in round

Track and road events
Men

Athlete	Event	Heat		Repechage		Semifinal		Final	
Athlete	Event	Result	Rank	Result	Rank	Result	Rank	Result	Rank
Chituru Ali	100 m	10.12	2 Q	—N/a		10.14	7	Did not advance	
Marcell Jacobs	100 m	10.05	2 Q	—N/a		9.92 SB	3 q	9.85 SB	5
Fausto Desalu	200 m	20.26	2 Q	—N/a		20.37	3	Did not advance	
Filippo Tortu	200 m	20.29	3 Q	—N/a		20.54	4	Did not advance	
Diego Pettorossi	200 m	20.63	4 R	20.53	2	Did not advance			
Luca Sito	400 m	44.99	3 Q	—N/a		45.01	5	Did not advance	
Davide Re	400 m	46.74	8 R	DNS		Did not advance			
Simone Barontini	800 m	1:46.33	4 R	1:45.56	1 Q	1.46.17	8	Did not advance	
Catalin Tecuceanu	800 m	1:44.80	2 Q	—N/a		1:45.38	3	Did not advance	
Pietro Arese	1500 m	3:35.30	3 Q	—N/a		3:33.03	6 Q	3:30.74 NR	8
Ossama Meslek	1500 m	3:39.96	15 R	3:35.32	3 Q	3:32.77 PB	8	Did not advance	
Federico Riva	1500 m	3:41.78	14 R	3:32.84 PB	1 Q	3:35.26	9	Did not advance	
Lorenzo Simonelli	110 m hurdles	13.27	2 Q	—N/a		13.38	5	Did not advance	
Alessandro Sibilio	400 m hurdles	48.43	4 q	—N/a		48.79	6	Did not advance	
Yassin Bouih	3000 m steeplechase	8:40.34	11	—N/a		Did not advance			
Osama Zoghlami	3000 m steeplechase	8:20.52	8	—N/a		Did not advance			
Yemaneberhan Crippa	Marathon	—N/a						2:10:36	25
Eyob Faniel	Marathon	—N/a						2:12:50	43
Daniele Meucci	Marathon	—N/a						2:14:02	51
Francesco Fortunato	20 km walk	—N/a						1:20.38	20
Riccardo Orsoni	20 km walk	—N/a						1:25.08	41
Massimo Stano	20 km walk	—N/a						1:19.12	4
Fausto Desalu; Marcell Jacobs; Matteo Melluzzo; Filippo Tortu	4 × 100 m relay	38.07	5 q	—N/a				37.68 SB	4
Alessandro Sibilio; Luca Sito; Vladimir Aceti; Edoardo Scotti	4 × 400 m relay	3:00.26 SB	3 Q	—N/a				2:59.72 SB	7

Women

Athlete	Event	Heat		Repechage		Semifinal		Final	
Athlete	Event	Result	Rank	Result	Rank	Result	Rank	Result	Rank
Zaynab Dosso	100 m	11.30	3 Q	—N/a		11.34	9	Did not advance	
Anna Bongiorni	200 m	23.49	7 R	DNS		Did not advance			
Dalia Kaddari	200 m	23.49	7 R	DNS		Did not advance			
Alice Mangione	400 m	51.60	5 R	51.07 PB	3	Did not advance			
Elena Bellò	800 m	1:59.98	7 R	2:02.91	4	Did not advance			
Eloisa Coiro	800 m	1:59.19 PB	4 R	2:00.31	2	Did not advance			
Ludovica Cavalli	1500 m	4:11.68	13 R	4:02.46	2 Q	4:03.59	12	Did not advance	
Federica Del Buono	1500 m	4:10.14	14 R	4:06.00	7	Did not advance			
Sintayehu Vissa	1500 m	4:00.69 PB	8 R	4:06.71	1 Q	3:58.11 NR	10	Did not advance	
Federica del Buono	5000 m	15:15.54	16	—N/a		Did not advance			
Nadia Battocletti	5000 m	14:57.65	2 Q	—N/a				14:31.64 NR	4
Nadia Battocletti	10000 m	—N/a						30:43.35 NR	2nd place, silver medalist(s)
Ayomide Folorunso	400 m hurdles	55.03	6 R	55.07	1 Q	54.92	5	Did not advance	
Alice Muraro	400 m hurdles	55.62	5 R	55.48	6	Did not advance			
Rebecca Sartori	400 m hurdles	55.81	6 R	55.44	5	Did not advance			
Giovanna Epis	Marathon	—N/a						2:38.26	67
Sofiia Yaremchuk	Marathon	—N/a						2:30.20 SB	30
Eleonora Giorgi	20 km walk	—N/a						1:31.49	23
Antonella Palmisano	20 km walk	—N/a						DNF	
Valentina Trapletti	20 km walk	—N/a						1:35.39	35
Arianna De Masi; Zaynab Dosso; Dalia Kaddari; Irene Siragusa	4 × 100 m relay	43.03	6	—N/a				Did not advance	
Ilaria Elvira Accame; Alice Mangione; Anna Polinari; Giancarla Trevisan	4 × 400 m relay	3:26.50	5	—N/a				Did not advance	

Mixed

Athlete	Event	Heat		Final	
Athlete	Event	Result	Rank	Result	Rank
Vladimir Aceti; Edoardo Scotti; Luca Sito; Alice Mangione; Anna Polinari	4 × 400 m relay	3:11.59	3 Q	3:11.84	6
Massimo Stano; Antonella Palmisano	Marathon walk relay	—N/a		2:53.52	6

Field events
Men

Athlete	Event	Qualification		Final	
Athlete	Event	Result	Rank	Result	Rank
Mattia Furlani	Long jump	8.01	6 q	8.34	3rd place, bronze medalist(s)
Stefano Sottile	High jump	2.24	=6 q	2.34	4
Gianmarco Tamberi	High jump	2.24	=6 q	2.22	11
Claudio Stecchi	Pole vault	5.70	13	Did not advance	
Andrea Dallavalle	Triple jump	16.65	19	Did not advance	
Andy Díaz	Triple jump	16.79	12 q	17.64 SB	3rd place, bronze medalist(s)
Emmanuel Ihemeje	Triple jump	16.50	20	Did not advance	
Leonardo Fabbri	Shot put	21.76	1 Q	21.70	5
Zane Weir	Shot put	21.00	11 q	20.24	11

Women

Athlete	Event	Qualification		Final	
Athlete	Event	Result	Rank	Result	Rank
Roberta Bruni	Pole vault	4.55	=1 q	4.40	14
Elisa Molinarolo	Pole vault	4.55	=1 q	4.70 PB	6
Larissa Iapichino	Long jump	6.87	2 Q	6.87	4
Dariya Derkach	Triple jump	14.35	6 Q	14.14	8
Ottavia Cestonaro	Triple jump	13.63	23	Did not advance	
Daisy Osakue	Discus throw	63.11	9 q	63.11	8
Sara Fantini	Hammer throw	72.40	8 q	69.58	12

Combined events – Women's heptathlon

Athlete	Event	100H	HJ	SP	200 m	LJ	JT	800 m	Final	Rank
Sveva Gerevini	Result	13.40	1.74	12.80 PB	23.58 PB	6.08	39.68	2:08.84 PB	6220	13
Sveva Gerevini	Points	1065	903	714	1021	874	661	982	6220	13

== Badminton ==
Italy entered one badminton players into the Olympic tournament based on the BWF Race to Paris Rankings.

Athlete	Event	Group stage			Elimination	Quarter-final	Semi-final	Final / BM	
Athlete	Event	Opposition Score	Opposition Score	Rank	Opposition Score	Opposition Score	Opposition Score	Opposition Score	Rank
Giovanni Toti	Men's singles	Opti (SUR); W 21–8 4–1 (ret)	Shi (CHN); L 21–9 21–10	2	Did not advance				14

== Boxing ==
Italy entered eight boxers into the Olympic tournament. Tokyo 2020 Olympian Giordana Sorrentino (women's flyweight) and bronze medalist Irma Testa (women's featherweight), along with two rookies (Cavallaro and Mouhiidine), secured the spots on the Italian squad in their respective weight divisions, either by advancing to the semifinal match or finishing in the top two, at the 2023 European Games in Nowy Targ, Poland. The other four boxers, (Diego, Sirine, Alessia and Angela) qualified themself to the games, following the home-crowd triumph of winning the quota bouts round, at the 2024 World Olympic Qualification Tournament 1 in Busto Arsizio.

Men

Athlete	Event	Round of 32	Round of 16	Quarterfinals	Semifinals	Final	
Athlete	Event	Opposition Result	Opposition Result	Opposition Result	Opposition Result	Opposition Result	Rank
Salvatore Cavallaro	80 kg	Aykutsun (TUR); L 1–4	Did not advance				17
Aziz Abbes Mouhiidine	92 kg	—N/a	Mullojonov (UZB); L 1–4	Did not advance			9
Diego Lenzi	+92 kg	—N/a	Edwards (USA); W 3–1	Tiafack (GER); L 0–5	Did not advance		5

Women

Athlete	Event	Round of 32	Round of 16	Quarterfinals	Semifinals	Final	
Athlete	Event	Opposition Result	Opposition Result	Opposition Result	Opposition Result	Opposition Result	Rank
Giordana Sorrentino	50 kg	Kyzaibay (KAZ); L 1–4	Did not advance				17
Sirine Charaabi	54 kg	Munguntsetseg (MGL); L 0–5	Did not advance				17
Irma Testa	57 kg	Xu (CHN); L 2–3	Did not advance				17
Alessia Mesiano	60 kg	Ozer (TUR); W 4–1	Harrington (IRL); L 0–5	Did not advance			9
Angela Carini	66 kg	Bye	Khelif (ALG); L ABD	Did not advance			9

== Breaking ==
Italy entered one breakdancer to compete in the B-Girl dual battles for Paris 2024. Antilai Sandrini (Anti) outlasted the female breakdancers from 2024 Olympic Qualifier Series in Shanghai, China and Budapest, Hungary.

Athlete	Nickname	Event	Round-robin		Quarterfinal	Semifinal	Final / BM	
Athlete	Nickname	Event	Points	Rank	Opposition Result	Opposition Result	Opposition Result	Rank
Antilai Sandrini	Anti	B-Girls	19	3	Did not advance			11

== Canoeing ==
=== Slalom ===
Italy entered four boat into the slalom competition, for the Games through the 2023 ICF Canoe Slalom World Championships in London, Great Britain.

Athlete	Event	Preliminary						Semifinal		Final	
Athlete	Event	Run 1	Rank	Run 2	Rank	Best	Rank	Time	Rank	Time	Rank
Raffaello Ivaldi	Men's C-1	91.90	4	94.96	6	91.90	4	108.20	14	Did not advance	
Giovanni De Gennaro	Men's K-1	88.46	12	85.34	3	85.34	3	93.47	8	88.22	1st place, gold medalist(s)
Marta Bertoncelli	Women's C-1	112.28	14	110.43	13	110.43	18	170.28	18	Did not advance	
Stefanie Horn	Women's K-1	99.64	15	95.43	7	95.43	7	101.04	4	101.43	5

Kayak cross

Athlete	Event	Time trial	Rank	Round 1	Repechage	Heat	Quarterfinal	Semifinal	Final	
Athlete	Event	Time trial	Rank	Position	Position	Position	Position	Position	Position	Rank
Giovanni De Gennaro	Men's KX-1	67.71	5	1 Q	Bye	1 Q	4	Did not advance		13
Marta Bertoncelli	Women's KX-1	78.38	28	2 Q	Bye	3	Did not advance			20
Stefanie Horn	Women's KX-1	75.19	17	3 R	1 Q	2 Q	4	Did not advance		16

=== Sprint ===
Italian canoeists qualified one boats in the following distances for the Games through the 2023 ICF Canoe Sprint World Championships in Duisburg, Germany; and 2024 European Qualifier in Szeged, Hungary.

Athlete	Event	Heats		Quarterfinals		Semifinals		Final	
Athlete	Event	Time	Rank	Time	Rank	Time	Rank	Time	Rank
Nicolae Craciun	Men's C-1 1000 m	3:53.90	4 QF	3:53.13	3	Did not advance			
Carlo Tacchini	Men's C-1 1000 m	3:59.59	3 QF	3:49.15	1 SF	3:45.42	4 FA	3:48.97	5
Gabriele Casadei; Carlo Tacchini	Men's C-2 500 m	1:39.17	2 SF	Bye		1:41.59	3 FA	1:41.08	2nd place, silver medalist(s)

Qualification Legend: QF = Qualify to quarterfinals; SF = Qualify to semifinal; FA = Qualify to final (medal); FB = Qualify to final B (non-medal)

== Cycling ==
=== Road ===
Italy entered a team of seven road cyclists (three male and four female). Italy also qualified one female and two male athletes to the time trial competition through the UCI Individual Ranking and 2023 World Championships in Glasgow, Great Britain.

Men

Athlete	Event	Time	Rank
Alberto Bettiol	Road race	6:21.54	23
Luca Mozzato	Road race	6:36.57	50
Elia Viviani	Road race	DNF	
Alberto Bettiol	Time trial	38:06.77	18
Filippo Ganna	Time trial	36:27.08	2nd place, silver medalist(s)

Women

Athlete	Event	Time	Rank
Elisa Balsamo	Road race	4:07:39	54
Elena Cecchini	Road race	4:04:23	25
Elisa Longo Borghini	Road race	4:02:28	9
Silvia Persico	Road race	4:07:39	55
Elisa Longo Borghini	Time trial	15:10:30	8

=== Track ===
Italy riders obtained a full squads of men's and women's team pursuit events; and two additional individual quotas for women's sprint and keirin, following the release of the final UCI Olympic rankings.

Sprint

Athlete	Event	Qualification		Round 1	Repechage 1	Round 2	Repechage 2	Round 3	Repechage 3	Quarterfinals	Semifinals	Finals / BM	
Athlete	Event	Time Speed (km/h)	Rank	Opposition Time Speed (km/h)	Opposition Time Speed (km/h)	Opposition Time Speed (km/h)	Opposition Time Speed (km/h)	Opposition Time Speed (km/h)	Opposition Time Speed (km/h)	Opposition Time Speed (km/h)	Opposition Time Speed (km/h)	Opposition Time Speed (km/h)	Rank
Miriam Vece	Women's sprint	10.560; 68.182	16 Q	Fulton (NZL); L 10.933; 65.856	Gaxiola (MEX); Nicolaes (BEL); L 11.594; 64.953	Did not advance							18
Sara Fiorin	Women's sprint	11.085; 64.953	26	Did not advance									26

Pursuit

Athlete	Event	Qualification		Semifinals		Final / BM	
Athlete	Event	Time	Rank	Opponent Results	Rank	Opponent Results	Rank
Simone Consonni; Filippo Ganna; Francesco Lamon; Jonathan Milan	Men's team pursuit	3:44.351	4 Q	Australia; L 3:43.205	4	Denmark; W 3:44.197	3rd place, bronze medalist(s)
Chiara Consonni; Martina Fidanza; Letizia Paternoster; Vittoria Guazzini; Elisa Balsamo	Women's team pursuit	4:07.579	4 Q	New Zealand; L 4:07.491	4	Great Britain; L 4:08.961	4

Keirin

Athlete	Event	Round 1		Repechage		Quarterfinals		Semifinals		Final	
Athlete	Event	Time	Rank	Time	Rank	Time	Rank	Time	Rank	Time	Rank
Miriam Vece	Women's keirin	11.228	3	11.089	3	Did not advance					19
Sara Fiorin	Women's keirin	11.981	6	11.351	5	Did not advance					27

Omnium

Athlete	Event	Scratch race		Tempo race		Elimination race		Points race		Total	
Athlete	Event	Rank	Points	Rank	Points	Rank	Points	Rank	Points	Rank	Points
Elia Viviani	Men's omnium	12	18	10	22	4	34	8	23	9	97
Letizia Paternoster	Women's omnium	10	22	15	12	6	30	14	20	11	84

Madison

Athlete	Event	Sprint	Laps	Points	Rank
Simone Consonni; Elia Viviani	Men's madison	27	20	47	2nd place, silver medalist(s)
Chiara Consonni; Vittoria Guazzini	Women's madison	17	20	37	1st place, gold medalist(s)

=== Mountain biking ===
Italian mountain bikers secured two men's and two women's quota places in the Olympic through the release of the final Olympic mountain biking rankings.

Athlete	Event	Time	Rank
Simone Avondetto	Men's cross-country	1:30:52	19
Luca Braidot	Men's cross-country	1:26:56	4
Martina Berta	Women's cross-country	1:32:50	14
Chiara Teocchi	Women's cross-country	1:31:52	11

=== BMX ===
Italy received a single quota place for BMX at the Olympics.

Race

Athlete	Event	Quarterfinal		Semifinal		Final	
Athlete	Event	Points	Rank	Points	Rank	Result	Rank
Pietro Bertagnoli	Men's race	14	12	15	9	Did not advance	9

== Diving ==
Italian divers secured ten quota places for Paris 2024. One of them successfully won a gold medal in the women's individual springboard at the 2023 European Games in Rzeszów, Poland, with four more spots awarded to the rest of the Italian diving squad, either by scoring a podium placement in the women's synchronized springboard or by advancing to the top twelve final of their respective individual events at the 2023 World Aquatics Championships in Fukuoka. The nations also secured two additional spots, through 2024 World Aquatics Championships in Doha, Qatar. And the rest of them won the unused quota reallocation places.

Athlete	Event	Preliminary		Semifinal		Final	
Athlete	Event	Points	Rank	Points	Rank	Points	Rank
Lorenzo Marsaglia	Men's 3 m springboard	405.05	7 Q	354.05	18	Did not advance	
Giovanni Tocci	Men's 3 m springboard	346.85	22	Did not advance			
Lorenzo Marsaglia; Giovanni Tocci	Men's 3 m synchronized springboard	—N/a				403.05	4
Andreas Sargent Larsen	Men's 10 m platform	369.50	16 Q	394.15	15	Did not advance	
Riccardo Giovannini	Men's 10 m platform	387.65	15 Q	400.65	13	Did not advance	
Elena Bertocchi	Women's 3 m springboard	282.30	14 Q	245.10	17	Did not advance	
Chiara Pellacani	Women's 3 m springboard	297.70	7 Q	324.75	3 Q	309.60	4
Sarah Jodoin di Maria	Women's 10 m platform	286.10	11 Q	294.85	10 Q	301.75	10
Maia Biginelli	Women's 10 m platform	277.00	18 Q	240.80	18	Did not advance	
Elena Bertocchi; Chiara Pellacani	Women's 3 m synchronized springboard	—N/a				293.52	4

== Equestrian ==
Italy fielded a squad of three eventing riders and one jumping rider, into the team eventing and individual jumping competitions, by securing the only available berth for nations that had not yet qualified at the 2023 Eventing Nation's Cup for eventing events in Boekelo, Netherlands, and through the establishments of final olympics ranking for Group B (South Western Europe).

=== Eventing ===
Athlete	Horse	Event	Dressage		Cross-country			Jumping						Total	
Athlete	Horse	Event	Dressage		Cross-country			Qualifier			Final			Total	
Athlete	Horse	Event	Penalties	Rank	Penalties	Total	Rank	Penalties	Total	Rank	Penalties	Total	Rank	Penalties	Rank
Evelina Bertoli	Fidjy des Melezes	Individual	26.60	13	6.40	33.00	19	5.20	38.20	19 Q	4.40	42.60	23	42.60	23
Emiliano Portale	Future	Individual	EL		Did not advance										
Giovanni Ugolotti	Swirly Temptress	Individual	25.70	9	36.40	62.10	46	22.00	84.10	46	Did not advance				
Evelina Bertoli; Emiliano Portale; Giovanni Ugolotti; Pietro Sandei	Fidjy des Melezes, Future, Swirly Temptress, Rubis de Prere	Team	152.30	16	76.80	229.10	13	35.60	264.70	13	—N/a			264.70	13

=== Jumping ===
Athlete	Horse	Event	Qualification			Final		
Athlete	Horse	Event	Penalties	Time	Rank	Penalties	Time	Rank
Emanuele Camilli	Odense Odeveld	Individual	0	75.10	8 Q	12	81.08	21

== Fencing ==
Italy entered full-squad fencers into the Olympic competition. The nations men's and women's foil team, men's and women's épée team, and also women's sabre team, qualified for the games after becoming one of the four highest ranked worldwide teams; meanwhile, women's sabre team qualified after becoming the highest ranked team, eligible for European zone, through the release of the FIE Official ranking for Paris 2024.

Athlete	Event	Round of 32	Round of 16	Quarterfinal	Semifinal	Final / BM	
Athlete	Event	Opposition Score	Opposition Score	Opposition Score	Opposition Score	Opposition Score	Rank
Davide Di Veroli	Men's épée	Rubeš (CZE); W 14–10	Yamada (JPN); L 11–15	Did not advance			
Andrea Santarelli	Men's épée	Freilich (ISR); W 15–13	El-Sayed (EGY); L 10–15	Did not advance			
Federico Vismara	Men's épée	Tulen (NED); W 15–11	Alimzhanov (KAZ); W 14–13	Andrásfi (HUN); L 13–15	Did not advance		
Davide Di Veroli; Andrea Santarelli; Federico Vismara; Gabriele Cimini*	Men's team épée	—N/a		Czech Republic; L 38–43	Classification semifinal Venezuela; W 45–34	Fifth place final Kazakhstan; W 45–36	5
Guillaume Bianchi	Men's foil	Van Haaster (CAN); W 15–4	Choupenitch (CZE); W 15–5	Itkin (USA); L 14–15	Did not advance		
Filippo Macchi	Men's foil	Xu J (CHN); W 15–10	Matsuyama (JPN); W 15–10	Hamza (EGY); W 15–9	Itkin (USA); W 15–11	Cheung (HKG); L 14–15	2nd place, silver medalist(s)
Tommaso Marini	Men's foil	Broszus (CAN); W 15–9	Pauty (FRA); L 14–15	Did not advance			
Guillaume Bianchi; Filippo Macchi; Tommaso Marini; Alessio Foconi*	Men's team foil	—N/a		Poland; W 45–39	United States; W 45–38	Japan; L 36–45	2nd place, silver medalist(s)
Luca Curatoli	Men's sabre	Yıldırım (TUR); W 15–10	Samele (ITA); L 12–15	Did not advance			
Michele Gallo	Men's sabre	Shen CP (CHN); L 6–15	Did not advance				
Luigi Samele	Men's sabre	Gordon (CAN); W 15–10	Curatoli (ITA); W 15–12	Amer (EGY); W 15–13	Oh S-u (KOR); L 5–15	El-Sissy (EGY); W 15–12	3rd place, bronze medalist(s)
Luca Curatoli; Michele Gallo; Luigi Samele; Pietro Torre*	Men's team sabre	—N/a		Hungary; L 38–45	Classification semifinal United States; W 45–40	Fifth place final Egypt; W 45–38	5
Rossella Fiamingo	Women's épée	Cebula (USA); L 14–15	Did not advance				
Giulia Rizzi	Women's épée	Klasik (POL); L 11–12	Did not advance				
Alberta Santuccio	Women's épée	Tikanah (SGP); W 15–10	Vitalis (FRA); W 15–12	Differt (EST); L 9–10	Did not advance		
Rossella Fiamingo; Giulia Rizzi; Alberta Santuccio; Mara Navarria*	Women's team épée	—N/a		Egypt; W 39–26	China; W 45–24	France; W 30–29	1st place, gold medalist(s)
Arianna Errigo	Women's foil	Catantan (PHI); W 15–12	Lacheray (FRA); W 15–6	Scruggs (USA); L 14–15	Did not advance		
Martina Favaretto	Women's foil	Amr Hossny (EGY); W 15–5	Ranvier (FRA); W 15–9	Harvey (CAN); L 14–15	Did not advance		
Alice Volpi	Women's foil	Łyczbińska (POL); W 15–11	Călugăreanu (ROU); W 15–9	Sauer (GER); W 15–12	Kiefer (USA); L 10–15	Harvey (CAN); L 12–15	4
Arianna Errigo; Martina Favaretto; Alice Volpi; Francesca Palumbo*	Women's team foil	—N/a		Egypt; W 45–14	Japan; W 45–39	United States; L 45–39	2nd place, silver medalist(s)
Michela Battiston	Women's sabre	Pusztai (HUN); L 12–15	Did not advance				
Martina Criscio	Women's sabre	Szűcs (HUN); L 10–15	Did not advance				
Chiara Mormile	Women's sabre	Berder (FRA); L 10–15	Did not advance				
Michela Battiston; Martina Criscio; Chiara Mormile; Irene Vecchi*	Women's team sabre	—N/a		Ukraine; L 37–45	Classification semifinal Hungary; L 35–45	Seventh place final Algeria; W 45–27	7

== Golf ==
Italy entered three golfers into the Olympic tournament. Guido Migliozzi, Matteo Manassero, and Alessandra Fanali; all qualified directly for the games in the individual competitions, based on their own world ranking positions, on the IGF World Rankings.

Athlete	Event	Round 1	Round 2	Round 3	Round 4	Total		
Athlete	Event	Score	Score	Score	Score	Score	Par	Rank
Matteo Manassero	Men's	69	69	69	69	276	−8	T18
Guido Migliozzi	Men's	68	67	74	68	277	−7	T22
Alessandra Fanali	Women's	75	76	77	76	304	+16	53

== Gymnastics ==
=== Artistic ===
Italy fielded a full-squad male and female gymnasts for Paris after advancing to the final round of team all-around, and obtained one of nine available team spot's for nation's, not yet qualified, at the 2023 World Championships in Antwerp, Belgium.

Men
Team

Athlete	Event	Qualification								Final							
Athlete	Event	Apparatus						Total	Rank	Apparatus						Total	Rank
Athlete	Event	F	PH	R	V	PB	HB	Total	Rank	F	PH	R	V	PB	HB	Total	Rank
Yumin Abbadini	Team	13.933	14.200	13.933	~~14.000~~	14.200	14.200	83.933	8 Q	14.066	14.200	13.633	—N/a		14.033	—N/a	
Lorenzo Casali	Team	14.000	~~11.700~~	13.600	14.433	14.000	13.433	81.166	25	13.700	—N/a	13.633	14.466	14.066	—N/a	—N/a	
Mario Macchiati	Team	~~13.566~~	13.833	13.400	14.500	~~13.766~~	13.166	82.231	16 Q	—N/a	13.566	13.566	14.300	14.333	12.833	—N/a	
Carlo Macchini	Team	—N/a	12.766	—N/a			~~12.766~~	—N/a		—N/a	12.766	—N/a			12.766	—N/a	
Nicola Bartolini	Team	14.000	—N/a		14.600	14.100	—N/a			14.133	—N/a		14.500	13.700	—N/a	—N/a	
Total	Team	41.933	40.799	40.400	43.533	42.300	40.799	249.764	6 Q	41.899	40.352	40.832	43.266	42.099	39.632	248.260	6

Individual finals

Athlete	Event	Final							
Athlete	Event	Apparatus						Total	Rank
Athlete	Event	F	PH	R	V	PB	HB	Total	Rank
Yumin Abbadini	All-around	13.900	14.166	13.333	14.033	13.966	13.800	83.198	11
Mario Macchiati	All-around	13.666	13.966	13.300	14.166	13.233	13.166	81.497	19

Women
Team

Athlete	Event	Qualification						Final					
Athlete	Event	Apparatus				Total	Rank	Apparatus				Total	Rank
Athlete	Event	V	UB	BB	F	Total	Rank	V	UB	BB	F	Total	Rank
Alice D'Amato	Team	13.200	14.666 Q	13.866 Q	13.700 Q	55.432	7 Q	13.933	14.633	13.933	13.466	—N/a	
Manila Esposito	Team	14.133	14.166	13.966 Q	13.633 Q	55.898	6 Q	14.166	—N/a	13.966	12.666	—N/a	
Giorgia Villa	Team	—N/a	13.666	—N/a				—N/a	13.766	—N/a		—N/a	
Angela Andreoli	Team	13.733	—N/a	13.366	13.500	—N/a		13.566	—N/a	13.300	12.833	—N/a	
Elisa Iorio	Team	13.766	14.366	12.966	12.800	53.898	13	—N/a	14.266	—N/a		—N/a	
Total	Team	41.632	43.198	41.198	40.833	166.861	2 Q	41.665	42.665	41.199	39.965	165.494	2nd place, silver medalist(s)

Individual finals

Athlete	Event	Final					
Athlete	Event	Apparatus				Total	Rank
Athlete	Event	V	UB	BB	F	Total	Rank
Alice D'Amato	All-around	14.000	14.800	14.033	13.500	56.465	4
Manila Esposito	All-around	13.866	12.800	14.200	12.733	53.599	14
Alice D'Amato	Uneven bars	—N/a	14.733	—N/a		14.733	5
Alice D'Amato	Balance beam	—N/a		14.366	—N/a	14.366	1st place, gold medalist(s)
Manila Esposito	Balance beam	—N/a		14.000	—N/a	14.000	3rd place, bronze medalist(s)
Alice D'Amato	Floor	—N/a			13.600	13.600	6
Manila Esposito	Floor	—N/a			12.133	12.133	9

=== Rhythmic ===
Italy entered one rhythmic gymnast into the individual all-around tournament by winning a gold medal and securing one of the three available berths at the 2022 World Championships in Sofia, Bulgaria.

Athlete	Event	Qualification						Final					
Athlete	Event	Hoop	Ball	Clubs	Ribbon	Total	Rank	Hoop	Ball	Clubs	Ribbon	Total	Rank
Milena Baldassarri	Individual	33.300	32.750	30.900	32.300	129.250	9 Q	32.600	33.150	32.500	31.450	129.700	8
Sofia Raffaeli	Individual	35.700	34.450	35.000	33.950	139.100	1 Q	35.250	32.900	35.900	32.250	136.300	3rd place, bronze medalist(s)

Athletes	Event	Qualification				Final			
Athletes	Event	5 apps	3+2 apps	Total	Rank	5 apps.	3+2 apps	Total	Rank
Alessia Maurelli; Martina Centofanti; Agnese Duranti; Daniela Mogurean; Laura Paris	Group	38.200	31.150	69.350	2 Q	36.100	32.000	68.100	3rd place, bronze medalist(s)

== Judo ==
Italy has qualified thirteen judokas via the IJF World Ranking List and continental quotas in Europe.

Athlete	Event	Round of 64	Round of 32	Round of 16	Quarterfinals	Semifinals	Repechage	Final / BM	
Athlete	Event	Opposition Result	Opposition Result	Opposition Result	Opposition Result	Opposition Result	Opposition Result	Opposition Result	Rank
Andrea Carlino	Men's −60 kg	—N/a	Katz (AUS); W 01–00	Yang (TPE); L 01–10	Did not advance				
Matteo Piras	Men's −66 kg	—N/a	Postigos (PER); W 10–00	Bunčić (SRB); L 00–01	Did not advance				
Manuel Lombardo	Men's −73 kg	—N/a	Stodolski (POL); W 10-00	Terada (THA); W 01-00	Gjakova (KOS); L 00–10	—N/a	Margelidon (CAN); W 10-00	Osmanov (MDA); L 00–10	5
Antonio Esposito	Men's −81 kg	Bye	Houinato (BEN); W 10 – 00	Schimidt (BRA); W 01-00	Gauthier-Drapeau (CAN); W 10 – 00	Nagase (JPN); L 00–10	—N/a	Makhmadbekov (TJK); L 00–10	5
Christian Parlati	Men's −90 kg	—N/a	Jayne (USA); L 00–10	Did not advance					
Gennaro Pirelli	Men's −100 kg	—N/a	Kumrić (CRO); W 10-00	Sulamanidze (GEO); L 00–10	Did not advance				
Assunta Scutto	Women's −48 kg	—N/a	Bye	Laborde (USA); W 10–00	Babulfath (SWE); L 00–10	—N/a	Boukli (FRA); L 00–01	Did not advance	
Odette Giuffrida	Women's −52 kg	—N/a	Bye	Delgado (USA); W 01–00	Pupp (HUN); W 01-00	Krasniqi (KOS); L 00-10	—N/a	Pimenta (BRA); L 00–10	5
Veronica Toniolo	Women's −57 kg	—N/a	Funakubo (JPN); L 00–01	Did not advance					
Savita Russo	Women's −63 kg	—N/a	Szymańska (POL); L 00–01	Did not advance					
Kim Polling	Women's −70 kg	—N/a	Pina (POR); W 01–00	Matic (CRO); L 00–10	Did not advance				
Alice Bellandi	Women's −78 kg	—N/a	Bye	Aguiar (BRA); W 01–00	Lytvynenko (UKR); W 10–00	Sampaio (POR); W 01–00	—N/a	Lanir (ISR); W 11–00	1st place, gold medalist(s)
Asya Tavano	Women's +78 kg	—N/a	Žabić (SRB); L 00–10	Did not advance					

Mixed

Athlete	Event	Round of 32	Round of 16	Quarterfinals	Semifinals	Repechage	Final / BM	
Athlete	Event	Opposition Result	Opposition Result	Opposition Result	Opposition Result	Opposition Result	Opposition Result	Rank
Gennaro Pirelli; Veronica Toniolo; Savita Russo; Manuel Lombardo; Kim Polling; Christian Parlati; Asya Tavano; Alice Bellandi; Odette Giuffrida	Team	Hungary; W 4–1	Georgia; W 4–3	Uzbekistan; W 4–2	France; L 1–4	—N/a	Brazil; L 3–4	5

== Modern pentathlon ==
Italian modern pentathletes confirmed four quota places (one male and two female) for Paris 2024. Tokyo 2020 Olympian Elena Micheli secured an outright berth in the women's event by winning the gold medal at the 2023 UIPM World Cup Final in Antalya, Turkey. Meanwhile, Micheli's teammate and two-time Olympian Alice Sotero, with rookie Giorgio Malan joining her on the men's side, topped the overall rankings and the list of those eligible for qualification with a successful gold-medal triumph each in their respective individual races at the 2023 European Games in Kraków, Poland. Mateo Cicinelli join the squad, through the release of final Olympic ranking.

Athlete	Event		Fencing (épée one touch)				Swimming (200 m freestyle)			Riding (show jumping)			Combined: shooting/running (10 m laser pistol)/(3000 m)			Total points	Final rank
Athlete	Event		RR	BR	Rank	MP points	Time	Rank	MP points	Penalties	Rank	MP points	Time	Rank	MP points	Total points	Final rank
Giorgio Malan	Men's	Semifinal	215	4	10	219	1:59.82	3	311	7	6	293	10:12.46	5	688	1511	3 Q
Giorgio Malan	Men's	Final	215	0	13	215	1:59.23	5	312	0	1	300	9:51.70	3	709	1536	3rd place, bronze medalist(s)
Matteo Cicinelli	Men's	Semifinal	220	0	8	220	1:59.90	5	311	7	11	293	10:16.62	9	684	1508	4 Q
Matteo Cicinelli	Men's	Final	220	0	11	220	1:59.06	4	312	7	9	293	9:58.23	9	702	1527	5
Elena Micheli	Women's	Semifinal	220	4	5	224	2:10.63	2	289	0	4	300	11:52.10	10	588	1401	2 Q
Elena Micheli	Women's	Final	220	12	3	232	2:12.47	5	286	7	14	293	11:27.86	12	613	1424	5
Alice Sotero	Women's	Semifinal	185	8	17	193	2:10.24	1	290	0	2	300	11:22.83	3	618	1401	3 Q
Alice Sotero	Women's	Final	185	6	18	191	2:09.96	1	291	0	6	300	11:33.81	15	607	1389	13

== Rowing ==
Italian rowers qualified boats in each of the following classes through the 2023 World Rowing Championships in Belgrade, Serbia, and the Final Qualification Regatta in Lucerne, Switzerland.

Men

Athlete	Event	Heats		Repechage		Semifinals		Final	
Athlete	Event	Time	Rank	Time	Rank	Time	Rank	Time	Rank
Nicolò Carucci; Matteo Sartori	Double sculls	6:48.77	4 R	6:43.83	4	Did not advance			
Stefano Oppo; Gabriel Soares	Lightweight double sculls	6:29.17	1 SA/B	—N/a	—N/a	6:22.85	1 FA	6:13.33	2nd place, silver medalist(s)
Davide Comini; Giovanni Codato	Coxless pair	6:50.25	4 R	6:50:31	2 SA/B	6:45.86	5 FB	6:28.62	12
Giacomo Gentili; Luca Chiumento; Andrea Panizza; Luca Rambaldi	Quadruple sculls	5:43.31	1 FA	—N/a	—N/a	—N/a	—N/a	5:44.40	2nd place, silver medalist(s)
Nicholas Kohl; Giuseppe Vicino; Matteo Lodo; Giovanni Abagnale	Coxless four	6:14.65	5 R	5:52.65	1 FA	—N/a	—N/a	5:55.07	4
Vincenzo Abbagnale; Matteo Della Valle; Gennaro Di Mauro; Jacopo Frigerio; Emanuele Gaetani Liseo; Salvatore Monfrecola; Leonardo Pietra Caprina; Davide Verita; Alessandra Faella (cox)	Eight	5:52.52	3 R	5:36.31	5	Did not advance			

Women

Athlete	Event	Heats		Repechage		Semifinals		Final	
Athlete	Event	Time	Rank	Time	Rank	Time	Rank	Time	Rank
Stefania Gobbi; Clara Guerra	Double sculls	7:15.51	5 R	7:10.41	3 SA/B	6:58.08	6 FB	6:56.87	11
Veronica Bumbaca; Alice Codato; Linda De Filippis; Alice Gnatta; Elisa Mondelli; Giorgia Pelacchi; Aisha Rocek; Silvia Terrazzi; Emanuele Capponi (cox)	Eight	6:28.47	3 R	6:09.65	4 FA	—N/a	—N/a	6:07.51	6

Qualification Legend: FA=Final A (medal); FB=Final B (non-medal); FC=Final C (non-medal); FD=Final D (non-medal); FE=Final E (non-medal); FF=Final F (non-medal); SA/B=Semifinals A/B; SC/D=Semifinals C/D; SE/F=Semifinals E/F; QF=Quarterfinals; R=Repechage

== Sailing ==
Italian sailors qualified one boat in each of the following classes through the 2023 Sailing World Championships in The Hague, Netherlands; the 2023 49erFX European Championship in Vilamoura, Portugal; and the 2024 Semaine Olympique Française (Last Chance Regatta) in Hyères, France.

Elimination events

Athlete	Event	Race																										Final rank
Athlete	Event	1	2	3	4	5	6	7	8	9	10	11	12	13	14	15	16	17	18	19	20	TOT	PTS	Rank	Quarterfinals	Semifinals	Finals	Final rank
Nicolò Renna	Men's IQFoil	2	15	~~25~~	4	2	5	~~25~~	12	12	7	1	9	4	Cancelled							123	73	6 Q	3	Did not advance		6
Marta Maggetti	Women's IQFoil	5	3	4	~~20~~	11	4	3	8	4	4	4	~~15~~	11	9	Cancelled						105	70	3 Q	Bye	2	1	1st place, gold medalist(s)

Athlete	Event	Race																															Final rank
Athlete	Event	1	2	3	4	5	6	7	8	9	10	11	12	13	14	15	16	TOT	PTS	EW	SF1	SF2	SF3	SF4	SF5	SF6	F1	F2	F3	F4	F5	F6	Final rank
Riccardo Pianosi	Men's Formula Kite	~~10~~	6	8	~~14~~	1	4	1	Cancelled									44	20	2	2	W	Qualify to Finals				3	4	2	—N/a	—N/a	—N/a	4
Maggie Pescetto	Women's Formula Kite	5	~~21~~	3	10	14	4	Cancelled										57	36	0	4	Did not advanced											10

Medal race events

Athlete	Event	Race													Net points	Final rank
Athlete	Event	1	2	3	4	5	6	7	8	9	10	11	12	M*	Net points	Final rank
Lorenzo Brando Chiavarini	Men's ILCA 7	25	21	4	6	17	~~27~~	5	19	—N/a				14	111	9
Chiara Benini Floriani	Women's ILCA 6	3	7	25	10	18	10	11	5	~~38~~	—N/a			2	91	5
Jana Germani; Giorgia Bertuzzi	Women's 49erFX	12	9	9	1	3	6	~~17~~	17	16	12	3	3	4	95	5
Elena Berta; Bruno Festo	Mixed 470	3	13	12	15	10	~~20~~	12	11	Cancelled		—N/a		EL	76	15
Ruggero Tita; Caterina Banti	Mixed Nacra 17	1	1	2	1	1	1	1	6	6	~~20~~	5	2	4	31	1st place, gold medalist(s)

EW= Earned wins; M = Medal race; EL = Eliminated – did not advance into the medal race

== Shooting ==
Italian shooters achieved quota places for the following events based on their results at the 2022 and 2023 ISSF World Championships, 2022, 2023, and 2024 European Championships, 2023 European Games, and 2024 ISSF World Olympic Qualification Tournament.

Men

Athlete	Event	Qualification		Final	
Athlete	Event	Points	Rank	Points	Rank
Edoardo Bonazzi	10 m air rifle	629.8	10	Did not advance	
Edoardo Bonazzi	50 m rifle 3 positions	588-38x	14	Did not advance	
Danilo Sollazzo	10 m air rifle	631.4	3 Q	187.4	5
Danilo Sollazzo	50 m rifle 3 positions	587-37x	19	Did not advance	
Paolo Monna	10 m air pistol	579-18x	5 Q	218.6	3rd place, bronze medalist(s)
Federico Nilo Maldini	10 m air pistol	581-16x	2 Q	240.0	2nd place, silver medalist(s)
Riccardo Mazzetti	25 m rapid fire pistol	583	12	Did not advance	
Massimo Spinella	25 m rapid fire pistol	586	5 Q	10	6
Mauro De Filippis	Trap	121	13	Did not advance	
Giovanni Pellielo	Trap	121	16	Did not advance	
Tammaro Cassandro	Skeet	124	2 Q	36	4
Gabriele Rossetti	Skeet	122	7	Did not advance	

Women

Athlete	Event	Qualification		Final	
Athlete	Event	Points	Rank	Points	Rank
Barbara Gambaro	10 m air rifle	626.8	24	Did not advance	
Barbara Gambaro	50 m rifle 3 positions	580-26x	23	Did not advance	
Silvana Stanco	Trap	122	4 Q	40	2nd place, silver medalist(s)
Jessica Rossi	Trap	120	9	Did not advance	
Diana Bacosi	Skeet	117	15	Did not advance	
Martina Bartolomei	Skeet	117	16	Did not advance	

Mixed

Athlete	Event	Qualification		Final	
Athlete	Event	Points	Rank	Points	Rank
Barbara Gambaro; Danilo Sollazzo	10 m air rifle team	625.4	17	Did not advance	
Gabriele Rossetti; Diana Bacosi	Skeet team	149	1 Q, =WR	45	1st place, gold medalist(s)
Tammaro Cassandro; Martina Bartolomei	Skeet team	144	5	Did not advance	

== Skateboarding ==
Italy entered two male skateboarders to compete in the following event at the Games.

Athlete	Event	Qualification		Final	
Athlete	Event	Score	Rank	Score	Rank
Alex Sorgente	Men's park	91.14	3 Q	84.26	6
Alessandro Mazzara	Men's park	83.17	11	Did not advance	

== Sport climbing ==
Italy qualified two climbers for Paris. Matteo Zurloni qualified for the games after winning the men's speed gold medal at the 2023 World Championships in Bern, Switzerland; meanwhile Beatrice Colli, Camilla Moroni and Laura Rogora qualified for the games through the 2024 Olympic Qualifier Series ranking.

Boulder & lead combined

Athlete	Event	Qualification						Final					
Athlete	Event	Boulder		Lead		Total	Rank	Boulder		Lead		Total	Rank
Athlete	Event	Result	Place	Result	Place	Total	Rank	Result	Place	Result	Place	Total	Rank
Camilla Moroni	Women's	64.0	8	36.1	19	100.1	12	Did not advance					
Laura Rogora	Women's	13.2	18	57.1	5	70.3	18	Did not advance					

Speed

Athlete	Event	Qualification		Round of 16	Quarterfinals	Semifinals	Final / BM	
Athlete	Event	Time	Rank	Opposition Time	Opposition Time	Opposition Time	Opposition Time	Rank
Matteo Zurloni	Men's	4.94	4	Long (CHN); W 5.06–5.18	Wu Peng (CHN); L 4.995–4.997	Did not advance		6
Beatrice Colli	Women's	8.18	11	Zhou (CHN); L 6.84–6.55	Did not advance			9

== Surfing ==
Italian surfers confirmed a single shortboard quota place for Tahiti. Tokyo 2020 Olympian Leonardo Fioravanti finished among the top ten of those eligible for qualification in the 2023 World Surf League rankings.

Athlete	Event	Round 1		Round 2		Round 3	Quarterfinal	Semifinal	Final / BM	
Athlete	Event	Score	Rank	Score	Rank	Opposition Result	Opposition Result	Opposition Result	Opposition Result	Rank
Leonardo Fioravanti	Men's shortboard	8.87	2 q	7.00	2	Did not advance				

== Swimming ==
Italian swimmers achieved the entry standards in the following events for Paris 2024 (a maximum of two swimmers under the Olympic Qualifying Time (OST) and potentially at the Olympic Consideration Time (OCT)):

Men

Athlete	Event	Heat		Semifinal		Final	
Athlete	Event	Time	Rank	Time	Rank	Time	Rank
Leonardo Deplano	50 m freestyle	21.79	6 Q	21.50	3 Q	21.62	7
Leonardo Deplano	100 m freestyle	48.82	23	Did not advance			
Lorenzo Zazzeri	50 m freestyle	21.64	4 Q	21.83	12	Did not advance	
Alessandro Miressi	100 m freestyle	48.24	7 Q	47.95	9	Did not advance	
Alessandro Ragaini	200 m freestyle	1:47.31	15 Q	1:47.08	14	Did not advance	
Filippo Megli	200 m freestyle	1:47.39	16 Q	1:46.87	13	Did not advance	
Marco De Tullio	400 m freestyle	3:47.90	17	—N/a		Did not advance	
Matteo Lamberti	400 m freestyle	3:48.38	20	—N/a		Did not advance	
Luca De Tullio	800 m freestyle	7:44.07	7 Q	—N/a		7:46.16	7
Gregorio Paltrinieri	800 m freestyle	7:42.48	3 Q	—N/a		7:39.38	3rd place, bronze medalist(s)
Luca De Tullio	1500 m freestyle	14:55.61	12	—N/a		Did not advance	
Gregorio Paltrinieri	1500 m freestyle	14:42.56	2 Q	—N/a		12:34.55	2nd place, silver medalist(s)
Thomas Ceccon	100 m backstroke	53.45	12 Q	52.58	2 Q	52.00	1st place, gold medalist(s)
Michele Lamberti	100 m backstroke	54.22	23	Did not advance			
Thomas Ceccon	200 m backstroke	1:57.69	14 Q	1:56.59	9	Did not advance	
Matteo Restivo	200 m backstroke	1:59.05	24	Did not advance			
Nicolò Martinenghi	100 m breaststroke	59.39	4 Q	59.28	6 Q	59.03	1st place, gold medalist(s)
Ludovico Blu Art Viberti	100 m breaststroke	59.93	15 Q	59.38	9	Did not advance	
Giacomo Carini	200 m butterfly	1:55.81	12 Q	1:55.20	12	Did not advance	
Alberto Razzetti	200 m butterfly	1:54.78	4 Q	1:54.51	7 Q	1:54.85	8
Alberto Razzetti	200 m individual medley	1:58.00	4 Q	1:57.10	7 Q	1:56.82	6
Alberto Razzetti	400 m individual medley	4:11.52	6 Q	—N/a		4:09.38	5
Alessandro Miressi; Thomas Ceccon; Paolo Conte Bonin; Manuel Frigo; Leonardo Deplano; Lorenzo Zazzeri	4 × 100 m freestyle relay	3:12.94	6 Q	—N/a		3:10.70	3rd place, bronze medalist(s)
Giovanni Caserta; Carlos D'Ambrosio; Alessandro Ragaini; Filippo Megli	4 × 200 m freestyle relay	7:08.63	9	—N/a		Did not advance	
Thomas Ceccon; Nicolò Martinenghi; Giacomo Carini; Alessandro Miressi	4 × 100 m medley relay	3:32.71	9	—N/a		Did not advance	
Domenico Acerenza	10 km open water	—N/a				1:51:09.6	4
Gregorio Paltrinieri	10 km open water	—N/a				1:51:58.0	9

Women

Athlete	Event	Heat		Semifinal		Final	
Athlete	Event	Time	Rank	Time	Rank	Time	Rank
Sara Curtis	50 m freestyle	24.67	13 Q	24.77	14	Did not advance	
Simona Quadarella	800 m freestyle	8:20.89	6 Q	—N/a		8:14.55 NR	4
Simona Quadarella	1500 m freestyle	15:51.19	2 Q	—N/a		15:44.05	4
Ginevra Taddeucci	1500 m freestyle	16:12.45	11	—N/a		Did not advance	
Margherita Panziera	200 m backstroke	2:11.60	20	Did not advance			
Lisa Angiolini	100 m breaststroke	1:06.37	10 Q	1:06.39	9	Did not advance	
Benedetta Pilato	100 m breaststroke	1:06.19	6 Q	1:06.12	7 Q	1:05.60	4
Francesca Fangio	200 m breaststroke	2:25.85	15 Q	2:25.39	14	Did not advance	
Costanza Cocconcelli	100 m butterfly	58.66	21	Did not advance			
Viola Scotto Di Carlo	100 m butterfly	DSQ		Did not advance			
Sara Franceschi	200 m individual medley	2:12.88	18	Did not advance			
Sara Franceschi	400 m individual medley	4:48.89	15	—N/a		Did not advance	
Sara Curtis; Emma Virginia Menicucci; Sofia Morini; Chiara Tarantino	4 × 100 m freestyle relay	3:36.28	8 Q	—N/a		3:36.51	8
Sofia Morini; Giulia D'Innocenzo; Matilde Biagiotti; Giulia Ramatelli	4 × 200 m freestyle relay	7:55.29	9	—N/a		Did not advance	
Margherita Panziera; Benedetta Pilato; Viola Scotto Di Carlo; Sofia Morini	4 × 100 m medley relay	DSQ		—N/a		Did not advance	
Giulia Gabbrielleschi	10 km open water	—N/a				2:04:17.9	6
Ginevra Taddeucci	10 km open water	—N/a				2:03:42.8	3rd place, bronze medalist(s)

Mixed

Athlete	Event	Heat		Final	
Athlete	Event	Time	Rank	Time	Rank
Michele Lamberti; Nicolò Martinenghi; Costanza Cocconcelli; Sofia Morini	4 × 100 m medley relay	3:45.80	11	Did not advance	

== Table tennis ==
Italy entered two table tennis players into Paris 2024. Giorgia Piccolin and Debora Vivarelli qualified for the games by virtue of the top twelve ranked players, in the women's single class, through the release of the final world ranking for Paris 2024.

Athlete	Event	Preliminary	Round of 64	Round of 32	Round of 16	Quarterfinals	Semifinals	Final / BM	
Athlete	Event	Opposition Result	Opposition Result	Opposition Result	Opposition Result	Opposition Result	Opposition Result	Opposition Result	Rank
Giorgia Piccolin	Women's singles	Bye	Hirano (JPN); L 0–4	Did not advance					
Debora Vivarelli	Women's singles	Bye	Hayata (JPN); L 0–4	Did not advance					

== Taekwondo ==
Italy qualified three athletes to compete at the Olympics. Tokyo 2020 gold medalist, Vito Dell'Aquila and Simone Alessio qualified for Paris 2024 by virtue of finishing in the top five in the Olympic rankings in their respective events. Meanwhile, Ilenia Matonti qualified for Paris 2024 by advancing to the women's under 49 kg final, at the 2024 European Qualification Tournament in Sofia, Bulgaria.

Athlete	Event	Round of 16	Quarterfinals	Semifinals	Repechage	Final / BM	
Athlete	Event	Opposition Result	Opposition Result	Opposition Result	Opposition Result	Opposition Result	Rank
Vito Dell'Aquila	Men's −58 kg	Ababakirov (KAZ); W 2–1	Salim (HUN); W 2–0	Magomedov (AZE); L 0–2	Bye	Ravet (FRA); L w/o	5
Simone Alessio	Men's −80 kg	Toleugali (KAZ); W 2–0	Barkhordari (IRI); L 1–2	Did not advance	Jaysunov (UZB); W 2–0	CJ Nickolas (USA); W 2–0	3rd place, bronze medalist(s)
Ilenia Elisabetta Matonti	Women's −49 kg	Dinçel (TUR); L 0–2	Did not advance				

== Tennis ==
For men's singles, Jannik Sinner, Lorenzo Musetti, Matteo Arnaldi, Luciano Darderi and Flavio Cobolli all secured a top 56 finish at the ATP Olympic race after the 2024 French Open. However, due to a maximum of four athletes per country being allowed to compete for the singles tournament, Cobolli didn't qualify. For men's doubles, Andrea Vavassori and Simone Bolelli will compete with Luciano Darderi and Lorenzo Musetti. On 24 July, Sinner announced he would not be competing at the Games due to tonsillitis. As a result, Vavassori replaced him in the singles and Darderi in the doubles.

For women's singles, Jasmine Paolini, Elisabetta Cocciaretto and Lucia Bronzetti secured a qualification, while Sara Errani will complete the team for women's doubles.

Men

Athlete	Event	Round of 64	Round of 32	Round of 16	Quarterfinals	Semifinals	Final / BM	
Athlete	Event	Opposition Score	Opposition Score	Opposition Score	Opposition Score	Opposition Score	Opposition Score	Rank
Matteo Arnaldi	Singles	Fils (FRA); W 6–4, 7–6^{(9–7)}	Koepfer (GER); L 6–3, 2–6, 1–6	Did not advance				
Luciano Darderi	Singles	Paul (USA); L 3–6, 4–6	Did not advance					
Lorenzo Musetti	Singles	Monfils (FRA); W 6–1, 6–4	Navone (ARG); W 7–6^{(7–2)}, 6–3	Fritz (USA); W 6–4, 7–5	Zverev (GER); W 7–5, 7–5	Djokovic (SRB); L 4–6, 2–6	Auger-Aliassime (CAN); W 6–4, 1–6, 6–3	3rd place, bronze medalist(s)
Andrea Vavassori	Singles	Martínez (ESP); W 6–4, 4–6, 6–4	Ruud (NOR); L 6–4, 4–6, 3–6	Did not advance				
Luciano Darderi; Lorenzo Musetti	Doubles	–	Jarry / Tabilo (CHI); L 3–6, 7–6^{(7–5)}, [5–10]	Did not advance				
Simone Bolelli; Andrea Vavassori	Doubles	–	Carreño Busta / Granollers (ESP); L 6–2, 6–7^{(5–7)}, [7–10]	Did not advance				

Women

Athlete	Event	Round of 64	Round of 32	Round of 16	Quarterfinals	Semifinals	Final / BM	
Athlete	Event	Opposition Score	Opposition Score	Opposition Score	Opposition Score	Opposition Score	Opposition Score	Rank
Lucia Bronzetti	Singles	Vekić (CRO); L 2–6, 5–7	Did not advance					
Elisabetta Cocciaretto	Singles	Shnaider (AIN); L 2–6, 5–7	Did not advance					
Sara Errani	Singles	Zheng (CHN); L 0–6, 0–6	Did not advance					
Jasmine Paolini	Singles	Bogdan (ROU); W 7–5, 6–3	Linette (POL); W 6–4, 6–1	Schmiedlová (SVK); L 5–7, 6–3, 5–7	Did not advance			
Sara Errani; Jasmine Paolini	Doubles	–	Routliffe / Sun (NZL); W 6–2, 6–3	Garcia / Parry (FRA); W 5–7, 6–3, [10–8]	Boulter / Watson (GBR); W 6–3, 6–1	Muchová / Nosková (CZE); W 6–3, 6–2	Andreeva / Shnaider (AIN); W 2–6, 6–1, [10–7]	1st place, gold medalist(s)
Lucia Bronzetti; Elisabetta Cocciaretto	Doubles	–	Bucșa / Sorribes Tormo (ESP); L 1–6, 2–6	Did not advance				

Mixed

Athlete	Event	Round of 16	Quarterfinals	Semifinals	Final / BM	
Athlete	Event	Opposition Score	Opposition Score	Opposition Score	Opposition Score	Rank
Andrea Vavassori; Sara Errani	Doubles	Andreeva / Medvedev (AIN); W 6–3, 6–2	Schuurs / Koolhof (NED); L 7–6^{(7–4)}, 3–6, [9–11]	Did not advance		

== Triathlon ==
Italy confirmed five quota places (two men's and three women's) in the triathlon events for Paris, following the release of final mixed relay and individual olympics qualification ranking.

Individual

Athlete	Event	Time						Rank
Athlete	Event	Swim (1.5 km)	Trans 1	Bike (40 km)	Trans 2	Run (10 km)	Total	Rank
Alessio Crociani	Men's	20:10	0:49	52:32	0:24	34:24	1:48.19	30
Gianluca Pozzatti	Men's	20:31	0:51	52:01	0:27	30:51	1:44:41	14
Alice Betto	Women's	23:41	0:56	58:11	0:28	30:40	1:57:56	16
Bianca Seregni	Women's	22:14	0:59	59:37	0:31	35:50	1:59:11	22
Verena Steinhauser	Women's	24:51	0:56	1:00.28	0:29	35:51	2:02:35	39

Relay

Athlete	Event	Time						Rank
Athlete	Event	Swim (300 m)	Trans 1	Bike (7 km)	Trans 2	Run (2 km)	Total group	Rank
Gianluca Pozzatti	Mixed relay	4:12	1:04	9:37	0:23	4:55	20:11	—N/a
Alice Betto	Mixed relay	4:58	1:08	10:40	0:27	5:47	23:00	—N/a
Alessio Crociani	Mixed relay	4:14	1:04	9:32	0:24	5:02	20:16	—N/a
Verena Steinhauser	Mixed relay	5:25	1:12	10:41	0:29	5:57	23:44	—N/a
Total	Mixed relay	—N/a					1:27:11	6

== Volleyball ==
=== Beach ===
Italian men's and women's pairs qualified for Paris based on the FIVB Beach Volleyball Olympic Ranking.

Athletes	Event	Preliminary round				Round of 16	Quarterfinal	Semifinal	Final / BM	
Athletes	Event	Opposition Score	Opposition Score	Opposition Score	Rank	Opposition Score	Opposition Score	Opposition Score	Opposition Score	Rank
Samuele Cottafava; Paolo Nicolai	Men's	Cherif / Ahmed (QAT); L 0–2	Nicolaidis / Carracher (AUS); W 2–0	Åhman / Hellvig (SWE); W 2–0	2	Partain / Benesh (USA); L 0–2	Did not advance			9
Alex Ranghieri; Adrian Carambula	Men's	Van de Velde / Immers (NED); W 2–1	Mol / Sørum (NOR); L 0–2	M. Grimalt / E. Grimalt (CHI); L 0–2	4	Did not advance				19
Valentina Gottardi; Marta Menegatti	Women's	Liliana / Paula (ESP); L 1–2	Abdelhady / Elghobashy (EGY); W 2–0	Ana Patricia / Duda (BRA); L 0–2	3	Hughes / Cheng (USA); L 1–2	Did not advance			9

=== Indoor ===
Summary

Team	Event	Group stage				Quarterfinal	Semifinal	Final / BM	
Team	Event	Opposition Score	Opposition Score	Opposition Score	Rank	Opposition Score	Opposition Score	Opposition Score	Rank
Italy men's	Men's tournament	Brazil; W 3–1	Egypt; W 3–0	Poland; W 3–1	1	Japan; W 3–2	France; L 0–3	United States; L 0–3	4
Italy women's	Women's tournament	Dominican Republic; W 3–1	Netherlands; W 3–0	Turkey; W 3–0	1	Serbia; W 3–0	Turkey; W 3–0	United States; W 3–0	1st place, gold medalist(s)

==== Men's tournament ====
Italy men's volleyball team qualified for the Olympics through the World Ranking qualification.

Team roster

The roster was announced on 8 July 2024.

Head coach: Ferdinando De Giorgi

- 5 Alessandro Michieletto OH
- 6 Simone Giannelli (c) S
- 7 Fabio Balaso L
- 8 Riccardo Sbertoli S
- 11 Giovanni Sanguinetti MB
- 12 Mattia Bottolo OH
- 14 Gianluca Galassi MB
- 15 Daniele Lavia OH
- 16 Yuri Romanò OP
- 19 Roberto Russo MB
- 23 Alessandro Bovolenta OP
- 31 Luca Porro OH

Group play

Pos	Team	Pld	W	L	Pts	SW	SL	SR	SPW	SPL	SPR	Qualification
1	Italy	3	3	0	9	9	2	4.500	269	224	1.201	Quarterfinals
2	Poland	3	2	1	5	7	5	1.400	260	256	1.016	Quarterfinals
3	Brazil	3	1	2	4	6	6	1.000	273	241	1.133	Quarterfinals
4	Egypt	3	0	3	0	0	9	0.000	144	225	0.640	

Source: Olympics
Rules for classification: Tiebreakers

27 July 2024; 13:00	Italy	3–1	Brazil	South Paris Arena 1, Paris; Attendance: 9,485; Referees: Vladimir Simonovic (SUI), Scott Dziewirz (CAN)
27 July 2024; 13:00	(25–23, 27–25, 18–25, 25–21); P2 Report			South Paris Arena 1, Paris; Attendance: 9,485; Referees: Vladimir Simonovic (SUI), Scott Dziewirz (CAN)

30 July 2024; 09:00	Italy	3–0	Egypt	South Paris Arena 1, Paris; Attendance: 9,415; Referees: Hamid Al-Rousi (UAE), Wojciech Maroszek (POL)
30 July 2024; 09:00	(25–15, 25–16, 25–20); P2 Report			South Paris Arena 1, Paris; Attendance: 9,415; Referees: Hamid Al-Rousi (UAE), Wojciech Maroszek (POL)

3 August 2024; 17:00	Poland	1–3	Italy	South Paris Arena 1, Paris; Attendance: 9,441; Referees: Juraj Mokrý (SVK), Denny Cespedes (DOM)
3 August 2024; 17:00	(15–25, 18–25, 26–24, 20–25); P2 Report			South Paris Arena 1, Paris; Attendance: 9,441; Referees: Juraj Mokrý (SVK), Denny Cespedes (DOM)

Quarterfinal

5 August 2024; 13:00	Italy	3–2	Japan	South Paris Arena 1, Paris; Attendance: 9,166; Referees: Ivaylo Ivanov (BUL), Wojciech Maroszek (POL)
5 August 2024; 13:00	(20–25, 23–25, 27–25, 26–24, 17–15); P2 Report			South Paris Arena 1, Paris; Attendance: 9,166; Referees: Ivaylo Ivanov (BUL), Wojciech Maroszek (POL)

Semifinal

7 August 2024; 20:00	Italy	0–3	France	South Paris Arena 1, Paris; Attendance: 9,547; Referees: Denny Cespedes (DOM), Ivaylo Ivanov (BUL)
7 August 2024; 20:00	(20–25, 21–25, 21–25); P2 Report			South Paris Arena 1, Paris; Attendance: 9,547; Referees: Denny Cespedes (DOM), Ivaylo Ivanov (BUL)

Bronze medal game

9 August 2024; 16:00	Italy	0–3	United States	South Paris Arena 1, Paris; Attendance: 9,376; Referees: Ivaylo Ivanov (BUL), Epaminondas Gerothodoros (GRE)
9 August 2024; 16:00	(23–25, 28–30, 24–26); P2 Report			South Paris Arena 1, Paris; Attendance: 9,376; Referees: Ivaylo Ivanov (BUL), Epaminondas Gerothodoros (GRE)

==== Women's tournament ====
Italy women's volleyball team qualified for the Olympics through the World Ranking qualification.

Team roster

The roster was announced on 8 July 2024.

Head coach: (Argentina) (Italy) Julio Velasco

- 1 Marina Lubian MB
- 3 Carlotta Cambi S
- 6 Monica De Gennaro L
- 8 Alessia Orro S
- 9 Caterina Bosetti OH
- 11 Anna Danesi (c) MB
- 17 Myriam Sylla OH
- 18 Paola Egonu OP
- 19 Sarah Fahr MB
- 21 Loveth Omoruyi OH
- 24 Ekaterina Antropova OP
- 27 Gaia Giovannini OH

Group play

Pos	Team	Pld	W	L	Pts	SW	SL	SR	SPW	SPL	SPR	Qualification
1	Italy	3	3	0	9	9	1	9.000	253	199	1.271	Quarter-finals
2	Turkey	3	2	1	5	6	6	1.000	250	262	0.954	Quarter-finals
3	Dominican Republic	3	1	2	3	5	7	0.714	264	284	0.930	Quarter-finals
4	Netherlands	3	0	3	1	3	9	0.333	260	282	0.922	

Source: Olympics
Rules for classification: Tiebreakers

28 July 2024; 09:00	Italy	3–1	Dominican Republic	South Paris Arena 1, Paris; Attendance: 9,368; Referees: Nurper Özbar (TUR), Angela Grass (BRA)
28 July 2024; 09:00	(25–19, 24–26, 25–21, 25–18); P2 Report			South Paris Arena 1, Paris; Attendance: 9,368; Referees: Nurper Özbar (TUR), Angela Grass (BRA)

1 August 2024; 17:00	Italy	3–0	Netherlands	South Paris Arena 1, Paris; Attendance: 9,400; Referees: Angela Grass (BRA), Sumie Myoi (JPN)
1 August 2024; 17:00	(29–27, 25–18, 25–19); P2 Report			South Paris Arena 1, Paris; Attendance: 9,400; Referees: Angela Grass (BRA), Sumie Myoi (JPN)

4 August 2024; 09:00	Italy	3–0	Turkey	South Paris Arena 1, Paris; Attendance: 9,384; Referees: Sumie Myoi (JPN), Hamid Al-Rousi (UAE)
4 August 2024; 09:00	(25–14, 25–16, 25–21); P2 Report			South Paris Arena 1, Paris; Attendance: 9,384; Referees: Sumie Myoi (JPN), Hamid Al-Rousi (UAE)

Quarterfinal

6 August 2024; 21:00	Italy	3–0	Serbia	South Paris Arena 1, Paris; Attendance: 9,253; Referees: Fabrice Collados (FRA), Epaminondas Gerothodoros (GRE)
6 August 2024; 21:00	(26–24, 25–20, 25–20); P2 Report			South Paris Arena 1, Paris; Attendance: 9,253; Referees: Fabrice Collados (FRA), Epaminondas Gerothodoros (GRE)

Semifinal

8 August 2024; 20:00	Turkey	0–3	Italy	South Paris Arena 1, Paris; Attendance: 9,309; Referees: Wojciech Maroszek (POL), Sumie Myoi (JPN)
8 August 2024; 20:00	(22–25, 19–25, 22–25); P2 Report			South Paris Arena 1, Paris; Attendance: 9,309; Referees: Wojciech Maroszek (POL), Sumie Myoi (JPN)

Gold medal game

11 August 2024; 13:00	United States	0–3	Italy	South Paris Arena 1, Paris; Attendance: 9,340; Referees: Fabrice Collados (FRA), Wojciech Maroszek (POL)
11 August 2024; 13:00	(18–25, 20–25, 17–25); P2 Report			South Paris Arena 1, Paris; Attendance: 9,340; Referees: Fabrice Collados (FRA), Wojciech Maroszek (POL)

== Water polo ==
Summary

Key:
- FT – After full time.
- P – Match decided by penalty-shootout.

Team	Event	Group stage						Quarterfinal	Semifinal	Final / BM	
Team	Event	Opposition Score	Opposition Score	Opposition Score	Opposition Score	Opposition Score	Rank	Opposition Score	Opposition Score	Opposition Score	Rank
Italy men's	Men's tournament	United States; W 12–8	Croatia; W 14–11	Montenegro; W 11–9	Romania; W 18–7	Greece; L 8–9	2 Q	Hungary; L 10–12	5th–8th place Spain; L 9–11	7th–8th place Australia; W 10–6	7
Italy women's	Women's tournament	France; L 8–9	United States; L 3–10	Greece; W 12–8	Spain; L 11–13	—N/a	3 Q	Netherlands; L 8–11	5th–8th place Canada; W 10–5	5th–6th place Hungary; L 12–15	6

=== Men's tournament ===
Italy men's national water polo team qualified for the Olympics by securing an outright berth at the 2024 World Aquatics Championships.

Team roster

The roster was announced on 7 July 2024.

Head coach: Sandro Campagna

- 1 Marco Del Lungo GK
- 2 Francesco Di Fulvio (c) W
- 3 Alessandro Velotto D
- 4 Tommaso Gianazza CF
- 5 Andrea Fondelli D
- 6 Francesco Condemi W
- 7 Vincenzo Renzuto CB
- 8 Gonzalo Echenique W
- 9 Nicholas Presciutti CB
- 10 Lorenzo Bruni CF
- 11 Edoardo Di Somma D
- 12 Matteo Iocchi Gratta CB
- 13 Gianmarco Nicosia GK

Group play

Pos	Team	Pld	W	PSW	PSL	L	GF	GA	GD	Pts	Qualification
1	Greece	5	3	1	0	1	61	52	+9	11 (Note: Greece 9–8 Italy)	Quarterfinals
2	Italy	5	3	1	0	1	60	43	+17	11	Quarterfinals
3	United States	5	3	0	0	2	59	51	+8	9 (Note: Croatia 11–14 United States)	Quarterfinals
4	Croatia	5	3	0	0	2	58	57	+1	9	Quarterfinals
5	Montenegro	5	1	0	2	2	45	50	−5	5	
6	Romania	5	0	0	0	5	37	67	−30	0	

Source: Olympics
Rules for classification: 1) Points; 2) Head-to-head points; 3) Head-to-head goal difference; 4) Head-to-head goals scored; 5) Goal difference.
Notes:

28 July 2024; 15:00 v	Report	Italy	12–8	United States	Paris Aquatic Centre, Paris; Referees: Tamás Kovács (HUN), Vojin Putniković (SRB)
28 July 2024; 15:00 v	Report	Score by quarters: 4–2, 1–1, 4–1, 3–4			Paris Aquatic Centre, Paris; Referees: Tamás Kovács (HUN), Vojin Putniković (SRB)
28 July 2024; 15:00 v	Report	three players 2	Goals	Daube 3	Paris Aquatic Centre, Paris; Referees: Tamás Kovács (HUN), Vojin Putniković (SRB)

30 July 2024; 12:05 v	Report	Croatia	11–14	Italy	Paris Aquatic Centre, Paris; Referees: Michiel Zwart (NED), Sébastien Dervieux (FRA)
30 July 2024; 12:05 v	Report	Score by quarters: 4–3, 2–3, 3–6, 2–2			Paris Aquatic Centre, Paris; Referees: Michiel Zwart (NED), Sébastien Dervieux (FRA)
30 July 2024; 12:05 v	Report	Fatović, Kharkov 2	Goals	Di Fulvio 4	Paris Aquatic Centre, Paris; Referees: Michiel Zwart (NED), Sébastien Dervieux (FRA)

1 August 2024; 16:35 v	Report	Italy	11–9 (PSO)	Montenegro	Paris Aquatic Centre, Paris; Referees: Boris Margeta (SLO), Michiel Zwart (NED)
1 August 2024; 16:35 v	Report	Score by quarters: 2–2, 2–2, 3–3, 1–1 PSO: 3–1			Paris Aquatic Centre, Paris; Referees: Boris Margeta (SLO), Michiel Zwart (NED)
1 August 2024; 16:35 v	Report	Di Fulvio, Echenique 2	Goals	Popadić 3	Paris Aquatic Centre, Paris; Referees: Boris Margeta (SLO), Michiel Zwart (NED)

3 August 2024; 21:05 v	Report	Italy	18–7	Romania	Paris Aquatic Centre, Paris; Referees: Tamás Kovács (HUN), Nicholas Hodgers (AUS)
3 August 2024; 21:05 v	Report	Score by quarters: 6–2, 4–1, 5–1, 3–3			Paris Aquatic Centre, Paris; Referees: Tamás Kovács (HUN), Nicholas Hodgers (AUS)
3 August 2024; 21:05 v	Report	three players 3	Goals	Colodrovschi 3	Paris Aquatic Centre, Paris; Referees: Tamás Kovács (HUN), Nicholas Hodgers (AUS)

5 August 2024; 15:10 v	Report	Greece	9–8	Italy	Paris La Défense Arena, Paris; Referees: Michiel Zwart (NED), Zhang Liang (CHN)
5 August 2024; 15:10 v	Report	Score by quarters: 2–2, 4–3, 0–1, 3–2			Paris La Défense Arena, Paris; Referees: Michiel Zwart (NED), Zhang Liang (CHN)
5 August 2024; 15:10 v	Report	Argyropoulos 4	Goals	Bruni, Condemi 3	Paris La Défense Arena, Paris; Referees: Michiel Zwart (NED), Zhang Liang (CHN)

Quarterfinal

7 August 2024; 20:35 v	Report	Italy	10–12 (PSO)	Hungary	Paris La Défense Arena, Paris; Referees: Adrian Alexandrescu (ROU), Veselin Mišković (MNE)
7 August 2024; 20:35 v	Report	Score by quarters: 2–3, 0–1, 5–2, 2–3 PSO: 1–3			Paris La Défense Arena, Paris; Referees: Adrian Alexandrescu (ROU), Veselin Mišković (MNE)
7 August 2024; 20:35 v	Report	Di Fulvio, Echenique 3	Goals	Manhercz 4	Paris La Défense Arena, Paris; Referees: Adrian Alexandrescu (ROU), Veselin Mišković (MNE)

5–8th place semifinal

9 August 2024; 13:00 v	Report	Italy	9–11	Spain	Paris La Défense Arena, Paris; Referees: Michiel Zwart (NED), Sébastien Dervieux (FRA)
9 August 2024; 13:00 v	Report	Score by quarters: 0–4, 3–2, 3–3, 3–2			Paris La Défense Arena, Paris; Referees: Michiel Zwart (NED), Sébastien Dervieux (FRA)
9 August 2024; 13:00 v	Report	Echenique, Iocchi Gratta 2	Goals	Granados, Perrone 3	Paris La Défense Arena, Paris; Referees: Michiel Zwart (NED), Sébastien Dervieux (FRA)

Seventh place game

10 August 2024; 19:35 v	Report	Australia	6–10	Italy	Paris La Défense Arena, Paris; Referees: David Gómez (ESP), Chisato Kurosaki (JPN)
10 August 2024; 19:35 v	Report	Score by quarters: 1–2, 1–3, 2–4, 2–1			Paris La Défense Arena, Paris; Referees: David Gómez (ESP), Chisato Kurosaki (JPN)
10 August 2024; 19:35 v	Report	Maksimovic 2	Goals	Iocchi Gratta 3	Paris La Défense Arena, Paris; Referees: David Gómez (ESP), Chisato Kurosaki (JPN)

=== Women's tournament ===
Italy women's national water polo team qualified for the Olympics by securing an outright berth at the 2024 World Aquatics Championships.

Team roster

The roster was announced on 11 July 2024.

Head coach: Carlo Silipo

- 1 Aurora Condorelli GK
- 2 Chiara Tabani CB
- 3 Giuditta Galardi CF
- 4 Silvia Avegno W
- 5 Sofia Giustini W
- 6 Dafne Bettini W
- 7 Domitilla Picozzi W
- 8 Roberta Bianconi W
- 9 Valeria Palmieri (c) CF
- 10 Claudia Marletta W
- 11 Agnese Cocchiere CF
- 12 Giulia Viacava CB
- 13 Caterina Banchelli GK

Group play

Pos	Team	Pld	W	PSW	PSL	L	GF	GA	GD	Pts	Qualification
1	Spain	4	4	0	0	0	51	36	+15	12	Quarterfinals
2	United States	4	3	0	0	1	53	27	+26	9	Quarterfinals
3	Italy	4	1	0	0	3	34	40	−6	3 (Note: Greece 3 Pts, +3 GD; Italy 3 Pts, +3 GD; France 3 Pts, −6 GD. Italy ranked above Greece due to more goals scored.)	Quarterfinals
4	Greece	4	1	0	0	3	33	41	−8	3	Quarterfinals
5	France (H)	4	1	0	0	3	24	51	−27	3	

Source: Olympics
Rules for classification: 1) Points; 2) Head-to-head points; 3) Head-to-head goal difference; 4) Head-to-head goals scored; 5) Goal difference.
(H) Host
Notes:

29 July 2024; 14:00 v	Report	France	9–8	Italy	Paris Aquatic Centre, Paris; Referees: Nóra Debreceni (HUN), Nicholas Hodgers (AUS)
29 July 2024; 14:00 v	Report	Score by quarters: 1–3, 3–3, 2–1, 3–1			Paris Aquatic Centre, Paris; Referees: Nóra Debreceni (HUN), Nicholas Hodgers (AUS)
29 July 2024; 14:00 v	Report	Dhalluin 3	Goals	Bianconi 2	Paris Aquatic Centre, Paris; Referees: Nóra Debreceni (HUN), Nicholas Hodgers (AUS)

31 July 2024; 18:30 v	Report	Italy	3–10	United States	Paris Aquatic Centre, Paris; Referees: Hélène Painchaud (CAN), Vojin Putniković (SRB)
31 July 2024; 18:30 v	Report	Score by quarters: 1–3, 1–3, 0–2, 1–2			Paris Aquatic Centre, Paris; Referees: Hélène Painchaud (CAN), Vojin Putniković (SRB)
31 July 2024; 18:30 v	Report	Marletta 2	Goals	Musselman 3	Paris Aquatic Centre, Paris; Referees: Hélène Painchaud (CAN), Vojin Putniković (SRB)

2 August 2024; 15:35 v	Report	Greece	8–12	Italy	Paris Aquatic Centre, Paris; Referees: Andrej Franulović (CRO), Nóra Debreceni (HUN)
2 August 2024; 15:35 v	Report	Score by quarters: 3–4, 0–2, 2–2, 3–4			Paris Aquatic Centre, Paris; Referees: Andrej Franulović (CRO), Nóra Debreceni (HUN)
2 August 2024; 15:35 v	Report	Eleftheriadou, Plevritou 3	Goals	Palmieri 4	Paris Aquatic Centre, Paris; Referees: Andrej Franulović (CRO), Nóra Debreceni (HUN)

4 August 2024; 15:35 v	Report	Italy	11–13	Spain	Paris Aquatic Centre, Paris; Referees: Andrej Franulović (CRO), Frank Ohme (GER)
4 August 2024; 15:35 v	Report	Score by quarters: 0–2, 4–3, 3–4, 4–4			Paris Aquatic Centre, Paris; Referees: Andrej Franulović (CRO), Frank Ohme (GER)
4 August 2024; 15:35 v	Report	Marletta 3	Goals	Espar 3	Paris Aquatic Centre, Paris; Referees: Andrej Franulović (CRO), Frank Ohme (GER)

Quarterfinal

6 August 2024; 15:35 v	Report	Netherlands	11–8	Italy	Paris La Défense Arena, Paris; Referees: Jennifer McCall (USA), Nóra Debreceni (HUN)
6 August 2024; 15:35 v	Report	Score by quarters: 2–2, 3–2, 1–1, 5–3			Paris La Défense Arena, Paris; Referees: Jennifer McCall (USA), Nóra Debreceni (HUN)
6 August 2024; 15:35 v	Report	four players 2	Goals	Marletta 3	Paris La Défense Arena, Paris; Referees: Jennifer McCall (USA), Nóra Debreceni (HUN)

5–8th place semifinals

8 August 2024; 13:00 v	Report	Italy	10–5	Canada	Paris La Défense Arena, Paris; Referees: Jennifer McCall (USA), Chisato Kurosaki (JPN)
8 August 2024; 13:00 v	Report	Score by quarters: 1–1, 4–1, 1–3, 4–0			Paris La Défense Arena, Paris; Referees: Jennifer McCall (USA), Chisato Kurosaki (JPN)
8 August 2024; 13:00 v	Report	Bianconi, Marletta 2	Goals	five players 1	Paris La Défense Arena, Paris; Referees: Jennifer McCall (USA), Chisato Kurosaki (JPN)

Fifth place game

10 August 2024; 14:00 v	Report	Hungary	15–12 (PSO)	Italy	Paris La Défense Arena, Paris; Referees: Natalia Markopoulou (GRE), Hélène Painchaud (CAN)
10 August 2024; 14:00 v	Report	Score by quarters: 3–3, 5–4, 0–2, 3–2 PSO: 4–1			Paris La Défense Arena, Paris; Referees: Natalia Markopoulou (GRE), Hélène Painchaud (CAN)
10 August 2024; 14:00 v	Report	Gurisatti 3	Goals	Bianconi, Marletta 3	Paris La Défense Arena, Paris; Referees: Natalia Markopoulou (GRE), Hélène Painchaud (CAN)

== Weightlifting ==
Italy entered three weightlifters into the Olympic competition. Sergio Massidda (men's 61 kg), Antonino Pizzolato (men's 89 kg) and Lucrezia Magistris (women's 59 kg) secured one of the top ten slots in their respective weight divisions based on the IWF Olympic Qualification Rankings.

Athlete	Event	Snatch		Clean & Jerk		Total	Rank
Athlete	Event	Result	Rank	Result	Rank	Total	Rank
Sergio Massidda	Men's −61 kg	~~132~~	DNF	–	–	–	DNF
Antonino Pizzolato	Men's −89 kg	172	4	212	2	384	3rd place, bronze medalist(s)
Lucrezia Magistris	Women's −59 kg	96	10	112	11	208	11

== Wrestling ==
Italy qualified two wrestlers for the following class into the Olympic competition. Aurora Russo qualified for the games through the 2024 World Qualification Tournament in Istanbul, Turkey. However, Frank Chamizo joined the squad due to the reallocation of Individual Neutral Athletes (AIN) claimed by the IOC.

Key:

- WO – walkover
- VT (ranking points: 5–0 or 0–5) – Victory by fall.
- VB (ranking points: 5–0 or 0–5) – Victory by injury (VF for forfeit, VA for withdrawal or disqualification)
- PP (ranking points: 3–1 or 1–3) – Decision by points – the loser with technical points.
- PO (ranking points: 3–0 or 0–3) – Decision by points – the loser without technical points.
- ST (ranking points: 4–0 or 0–4) – Great superiority – the loser without technical points and a margin of victory of at least 8 (Greco-Roman) or 10 (freestyle) points.
- SP (ranking points: 4–1 or 1–4) – Technical superiority – the loser with technical points and a margin of victory of at least 8 (Greco-Roman) or 10 (freestyle) points.

Freestyle

Athlete	Event	Round of 32	Round of 16	Quarterfinal	Semifinal	Repechage	Final / BM	
Athlete	Event	Opposition Result	Opposition Result	Opposition Result	Opposition Result	Opposition Result	Opposition Result	Rank
Frank Chamizo	Men's −74 kg	Emami (IRI); L 4–9	Did not advance					
Emanuela Liuzzi	Women's −50 kg	—N/a	Otgonjargal (MGL); L WO	Did not advance				
Aurora Russo	Women's −57 kg	—N/a	Valverde (ECU); L 0–6^{F}	Did not advance				

== See also ==
- Italy at the 2024 Winter Youth Olympics
