= 2023 World Taekwondo Championships – Men's welterweight =

Taekwondo competitions

Men's welterweight at the 2023 World Championships
- Venue: Baku Crystal Hall
- Dates: 31 May 2023
- Competitors: 52 from 48 nations

Medalists
gold medal	Simone Alessio	Italy
silver medal	CJ Nickolas	United States
bronze medal	Miguel Trejos	Colombia
bronze medal	Seif Eissa	Egypt

The men's welterweight is a competition featured at the 2023 World Taekwondo Championships, and was held at the Baku Crystal Hall in Baku, Azerbaijan on 31 May 2023. Welterweights were limited to a maximum of 80 kilograms in body mass.

== Results ==
Legend

- DQ — Won by disqualification
- P — Won by punitive declaration

=== Finals ===
Semifinals			Final
Simone Alessio (ITA)	0	4
Miguel Trejos (COL)	0	2	Simone Alessio (ITA)	0	2
CJ Nickolas (USA)	2	10	CJ Nickolas (USA)	0	1
Seif Eissa (EGY)	0	5

=== Top half ===
==== Section 1 ====
Round of 64
Tang Hao (CHN)	14	13
Ali Al-Mabrouk (KSA)	10	11
Nurlan Myrzabayev (KAZ)	9	8
Ryan Doyle (IRL)	1	4
Foysal Ahmed (BAN)	0	0
Matej Nikolić (CRO)	14	12
~~Jerome Browne (TTO)~~
Mehran Barkhordari (IRI)	D	Q
Szymon Piątkowski (POL)	9	12
Kalvin Mbaiguinam (CMR)	3	0

Round of 32
Simone Alessio (ITA)	8	12
Tang Hao (CHN)	0	0
Nurlan Myrzabayev (KAZ)	6	6	8
Matej Nikolić (CRO)	6	6	16
Shukhrat Salaev (UZB)	4	6
Mehran Barkhordari (IRI)	3	5
Szymon Piątkowski (POL)	6	10
Park Woo-hyeok (KOR)	10	12

Round of 16
Simone Alessio (ITA)	4	2
Matej Nikolić (CRO)	0	0
Shukhrat Salaev (UZB)	9	1
Park Woo-hyeok (KOR)	10	13

Quarterfinals
Simone Alessio (ITA)	2	5
Park Woo-hyeok (KOR)	2	3

==== Section 2 ====
Round of 64
Rishabh Chaudhary (IND)	12	1	1
José María Pastor (MEX)	2	6	9
Joaquín Churchill (CHI)	5	8
Phạm Minh Bảo Kha (VIE)	3	3
Miguel Trejos (COL)	7	10
Hung Jiun-yi (TPE)	5	0
Mehdi Mohammadi (RTA)	0	2
Lucas Ostapiv (BRA)	5	15
Ababacar Sadikh Soumaré (SEN)	12	12
Teddy Lessakolo (GAB)	6	7

Round of 32
Saleh El-Sharabaty (JOR)	1	7
José María Pastor (MEX)	0	3
Joaquín Churchill (CHI)	5	2
Andoni Cintado (ESP)	1	2
Miguel Trejos (COL)	3	4	8
Lucas Ostapiv (BRA)	0	5	5
Ababacar Sadikh Soumaré (SEN)	0	4
Aliaskar Aliyev (AZE)	4	5

Round of 16
Saleh El-Sharabaty (JOR)	11	10
Joaquín Churchill (CHI)	6	9
Miguel Trejos (COL)	7	12	15
Aliaskar Aliyev (AZE)	2	12	8

Quarterfinals
Saleh El-Sharabaty (JOR)	8	3
Miguel Trejos (COL)	12	7^{P}

=== Bottom half ===
==== Section 3 ====
Round of 64
Mihai Cristescu (ROU)	1	8	2
Dylan Olmedo (ARG)	4	2	0
Ismaël Bouzid (FRA)	8	8
Bandar Al-Enezi (KUW)	6	1
Amarbayasgalangiin Bilgüün (MGL)	2	0
Aleksandar Radojkovic (AUT)	15	12
Adam Jochman (CZE)	2	5
Edi Hrnic (DEN)	13	9
Kasra Mehdipournejad (RTA)	12	10
Ivan Paulouski (AIN)	2	4

Round of 32
CJ Nickolas (USA)	11^{P}	7^{P}
Mihai Cristescu (ROU)	2	0
Ismaël Bouzid (FRA)	4	10	7
Aleksandar Radojkovic (AUT)	5	5	4
Moisés Hernández (DOM)	2	5
Edi Hrnic (DEN)	2	9
Kasra Mehdipournejad (RTA)	3	8
Richard Ordemann (NOR)	7	13

Round of 16
CJ Nickolas (USA)	14	16
Ismaël Bouzid (FRA)	4	5
Edi Hrnic (DEN)	4	11	2
Richard Ordemann (NOR)	5	1	5

Quarterfinals
CJ Nickolas (USA)	9	4
Richard Ordemann (NOR)	7	2

==== Section 4 ====
Round of 64
Cédric Ndzouli (CAN)	0	9	3
Liam Sweeney (AUS)	3	6	6
Youssef Boatris (MAR)	6	12
Syafiq Zuber (MAS)	3	7
David Robleto (NCA)	6	11
Tiago Lopes (POR)	1	5
Ismaël Coulibaly (MLI)	2	8	14
Hüseyin Kartal (TUR)	9	7	11
Alejandro González (PUR)	5	6
Farzad Mansouri (RTA)	11	9

Round of 32
Apostolos Telikostoglou (GRE)	3	6
Liam Sweeney (AUS)	6	6
Youssef Boatris (MAR)	7	6	3
Faysal Sawadogo (BUR)	4	12	4
David Robleto (NCA)	11	1	10
Ismaël Coulibaly (MLI)	3	13	10
Farzad Mansouri (RTA)	2	2
Seif Eissa (EGY)	3	3

Round of 16
Liam Sweeney (AUS)	0	6	4
Faysal Sawadogo (BUR)	8	5	4
Ismaël Coulibaly (MLI)	2	8
Seif Eissa (EGY)	8	11

Quarterfinals
Faysal Sawadogo (BUR)	2	7	5
Seif Eissa (EGY)	7	6	8
