= Taekwondo at the 2023 Pan American Games – Men's Kyorugi team =

Men's kyorugi team at the 2023 Pan American Games
- Venue: Contact Sports Center
- Date: October 24, 2023
- Competitors: 36 from 12 nations

Medalists
Gold medal	Brazil
Silver medal	Chile
Bronze medal	Mexico
Bronze medal	Ecuador

The men's kyorugi team competition of the taekwondo events at the 2023 Pan American Games was held on October 24, 2023 at the Contact Sports Center in Santiago, Chile.

== Rosters ==
12 NOCs competed in teams composed of three athletes each.

Team	Athletes		
Argentina	Lucas Guzman	José Luis Acuña	Agustín Alves
Brazil	Edival Pontes	Maicon Siqueira	Paulo Ricardo Melo
Canada	Marc-André Bergeron	Tae-Ku Park	Braven Park
Chile	Joaquín Churchill	Ignacio Morales	Aaron Contreras
Colombia	David Paz	Miguel Trejos	Jhon Garrido
Cuba	Ángel Fernández	Guillermo Pérez	Kelvin Calderón
Dominican Republic	Cristofer Reyes	Moises Hernandez	Bernardo Pie
Ecuador	Adrian Miranda	José Carlos Nieto	Julio Arroyo
Mexico	Uriel Gómez	Carlos Navarro	Bryan Salazar
Puerto Rico	Alejandro González	Luis De Jesús	Edrick Morales
United States	Carl Nickolas	Khalfani Harris	Michael Rodríguez
Venezuela	Luis Álvarez	Edgar Contreras	Yohandri Granado

== Results ==
=== Bracket ===
Round of 16
Venezuela	82
Canada	85
Ecuador	72
Puerto Rico	32
Brazil	101
Argentina	95

Quarterfinals
Mexico	61
Canada	49
Colombia	76
Chile	83
Dominican Republic	63
Ecuador	74
Brazil	76
Cuba	70

Semifinals
Mexico	64
Chile	81
Brazil	67
Ecuador	37

Gold medal match
Chile	16
Brazil	48
