= 2020 Boys' U18 Volleyball European Championship =

2020 Boys' U18 European Championship
Tournament details
- Host country: Italy
- Dates: 5–13 September
- Teams: 8 (from 1 confederation)
- Venue: 2 (in 2 host cities)

Final positions
- Champions: Italy (2nd title)
- Runners-up: Czech Republic
- Third place: Poland
- Fourth place: Bulgaria

Tournament awards
- MVP: (Italy) Luca Porro
- Best Setter: (Czech Republic) Šimon Bryknar
- Best OH: (Italy) Luca Porro (Poland) Kamil Szymendera
- Best MB: (Czech Republic) Jakub Klajmon (Poland) Mateusz Nowak
- Best OPP: (Bulgaria) Georgi Tatarov
- Best Libero: (Italy) Gabriele Laurenzano

The 2020 Boys' U18 Volleyball European Championship was the 14th edition of the Boys' Youth European Volleyball Championship, organised by Europe's governing volleyball body, the CEV. Originally, the tournament was scheduled to be hosted jointly by Italy and Greece, but the latter gave up the hosting right. The tournament was held in Lecce and Marsicovetere, Italy from 5 to 13 September 2020. The top six teams of the tournament qualified for the 2021 FIVB Volleyball Boys' U19 World Championship as the CEV representatives.

Players must be born on or after 1 January 2003.

== Qualification ==
The second round qualification was canceled due to the COVID-19 pandemic and the remaining six spots were allocated according to the Men's U18 CEV European Ranking as of 1 June 2019. But, Finland, France, Russia and Slovakia withdrew just before the beginning of the tournament due to travel restrictions still in place in response to the COVID-19 pandemic.

- Hosts
  - Italy
- Qualified through the first round qualification
  - Czech Republic
  - ~~Finland~~
  - ~~France~~
  - Poland
  - Turkey
- Top six ranked teams from the Men's U18 CEV European Ranking as of 1 June 2019 which had not yet qualified
  - ~~Russia~~
  - Belgium
  - Bulgaria
  - Germany
  - ~~Slovakia~~
  - Belarus

== Pools composition ==
Hosts Italy and Czech Republic, the top team from the Men's U18 CEV European Ranking as of 1 June 2019, were directly placed as head of pool I and II respectively. All teams not seeded were placed to five pots as based on their Men's U18 CEV European Ranking as of 1 June 2019 position and drawn accordingly into pool I and II. In case several teams shared the same position, the teams were seeded as per the final standing of the 2018 Boys' U18 European Championship. The draw was held in Luxembourg City, Luxembourg on 14 August 2020. But, Finland, France, Russia and Slovakia withdrew after the draw. Rankings are shown in brackets except the hosts who ranked 2nd.

Seeded teams	Pot 1	Pot 2	Pot 3	Pot 4	Pot 5
Italy (Hosts); Czech Republic (1)	Russia (3); Turkey (4)	Belgium (5); France (5)	Bulgaria (7); Germany (8)	Slovakia (8); Belarus (10)	Poland (10); Finland (12)

Draw

Pool I	Pool II
Italy	Czech Republic
Turkey	~~Russia~~
Belgium	~~France~~
Bulgaria	Germany
~~Slovakia~~	Belarus
~~Finland~~	Poland

== Venues ==
- Sport Hall Villa D’Agri, Marsicovetere, Italy – Pool I and 5th–8th places
- Lecce Sport Hall, Lecce, Italy – Pool II and Final four

== Pool standing procedure ==
1. Number of matches won
2. Match points
3. Sets ratio
4. Points ratio
5. If the tie continues as per the point ratio between two teams, the priority will be given to the team which won the match between them. When the tie in points ratio is between three or more teams, a new classification of these teams in the terms of points 1, 2, 3 and 4 will be made taking into consideration only the matches in which they were opposed to each other.

Match won 3–0 or 3–1: 3 match points for the winner, 0 match points for the loser
Match won 3–2: 2 match points for the winner, 1 match point for the loser

== Preliminary round ==
- All times are Central European Summer Time (UTC+02:00).

=== Pool I ===
Pos	Team	Pld	W	L	Pts	SW	SL	SR	SPW	SPL	SPR	Qualification
1	Bulgaria	3	3	0	8	9	2	4.500	253	221	1.145	Semifinals
2	Italy	3	2	1	6	8	5	1.600	282	254	1.110	Semifinals
3	Belgium	3	1	2	3	3	6	0.500	197	219	0.900	5th–8th semifinals
4	Turkey	3	0	3	1	2	9	0.222	223	261	0.854	5th–8th semifinals

Date	Time		Score		Set 1	Set 2	Set 3	Set 4	Set 5	Total	Report
5 Sep	17:00	Belgium	0–3	Bulgaria	17–25	21–25	23–25			61–75	Report
5 Sep	20:00	Italy	3–2	Turkey	28–30	16–25	25–14	25–16	15–7	109–92	Report
7 Sep	17:00	Bulgaria	3–0	Turkey	25–23	25–19	25–20			75–62	Report
7 Sep	20:00	Belgium	0–3	Italy	21–25	21–25	17–25			59–75	Report
9 Sep	17:00	Turkey	0–3	Belgium	25–27	22–25	22–25			69–77	Report
9 Sep	20:00	Italy	2–3	Bulgaria	25–16	13–25	24–26	25–21	11–15	98–103	Report

=== Pool II ===
Pos	Team	Pld	W	L	Pts	SW	SL	SR	SPW	SPL	SPR	Qualification
1	Poland	3	3	0	9	9	1	9.000	249	177	1.407	Semifinals
2	Czech Republic	3	2	1	6	6	3	2.000	204	185	1.103	Semifinals
3	Germany	3	1	2	2	3	8	0.375	221	255	0.867	5th–8th semifinals
4	Belarus	3	0	3	1	3	9	0.333	224	281	0.797	5th–8th semifinals

Date	Time		Score		Set 1	Set 2	Set 3	Set 4	Set 5	Total	Report
5 Sep	17:00	Germany	3–2	Belarus	22–25	25–20	25–23	22–25	15–10	109–103	Report
5 Sep	20:00	Czech Republic	0–3	Poland	21–25	22–25	11–25			54–75	Report
7 Sep	17:00	Poland	3–0	Germany	27–25	25–15	25–19			77–59	Report
7 Sep	20:00	Belarus	0–3	Czech Republic	16–25	21–25	20–25			57–75	Report
9 Sep	17:00	Poland	3–1	Belarus	25–12	22–25	25–13	25–14		97–64	Report
9 Sep	20:00	Czech Republic	3–0	Germany	25–18	25–22	25–13			75–53	Report

== Final round ==
- All times are Central European Summer Time (UTC+02:00).

=== 5th–8th places ===
5th–8th semifinals
12 September
Belgium	3
Belarus	0
12 September
Germany	3
Turkey	1

5th place match
13 September
Belgium	1
Germany	3
7th place match
13 September
Belarus	1
Turkey	3

==== 5th–8th semifinals ====
Date	Time		Score		Set 1	Set 2	Set 3	Set 4	Set 5	Total	Report
12 Sep	17:00	Belgium	3–0	Belarus	25–19	25–21	25–18			75–58	Report
12 Sep	20:00	Germany	3–1	Turkey	24–26	26–24	27–25	25–21		102–96	Report

==== 7th place match ====
Date	Time		Score		Set 1	Set 2	Set 3	Set 4	Set 5	Total	Report
13 Sep	17:00	Belarus	1–3	Turkey	18–25	22–25	25–22	17–25		82–97	Report

==== 5th place match ====
Date	Time		Score		Set 1	Set 2	Set 3	Set 4	Set 5	Total	Report
13 Sep	20:00	Belgium	1–3	Germany	25–27	20–25	27–25	15–25		87–102	Report

=== Final four ===
Semifinals
12 September
Bulgaria	0
Czech Republic	3
12 September
Poland	2
Italy	3

Final
13 September
Czech Republic	0
Italy	3
3rd place match
13 September
Bulgaria	1
Poland	3

==== Semifinals ====
Date	Time		Score		Set 1	Set 2	Set 3	Set 4	Set 5	Total	Report
12 Sep	17:00	Bulgaria	0–3	Czech Republic	19–25	22–25	19–25			60–75	Report
12 Sep	20:00	Poland	2–3	Italy	22–25	25–16	13–25	25–20	13–15	98–101	Report

==== 3rd place match ====
Date	Time		Score		Set 1	Set 2	Set 3	Set 4	Set 5	Total	Report
13 Sep	17:00	Bulgaria	1–3	Poland	21–25	27–29	25–23	23–25		96–102	Report

==== Final ====
Date	Time		Score		Set 1	Set 2	Set 3	Set 4	Set 5	Total	Report
13 Sep	20:00	Czech Republic	0–3	Italy	23–25	16–25	18–25			57–75	Report

== Final standing ==
Rank	Team
1st place, gold medalist(s)	Italy
2nd place, silver medalist(s)	Czech Republic
3rd place, bronze medalist(s)	Poland
4	Bulgaria
5	Germany
6	Belgium
7	Turkey
8	Belarus

Qualified for the 2021 U19 World Championship

2020 Boys' U18 European champions

Italy
2nd title

12–man roster
Cosimo Balestra, Mattia Boninfante, Gianluca Rossi, Marco Zoratti, Nicolò Volpe, Gabriele Laurenzano, Francesco Quagliozzi, Ranieri Truocchio, Luca Porro, Mattia Orioli, Matteo Staforini (c), Federico Bonacchi
Head coach
Vincenzo Fanizza

== Awards ==
- Most valuable player
  (Italy) Luca Porro
- Best setter
  (Czech Republic) Šimon Bryknar
- Best outside spikers
  (Italy) Luca Porro
  (Poland) Kamil Szymendera
- Best middle blockers
  (Czech Republic) Jakub Klajmon
  (Poland) Mateusz Nowak
- Best opposite spiker
  (Bulgaria) Georgi Tatarov
- Best libero
  (Italy) Gabriele Laurenzano

== See also ==
- 2020 Girls' U17 Volleyball European Championship
