= Simone Alessio =

Italian taekwondo practitioner

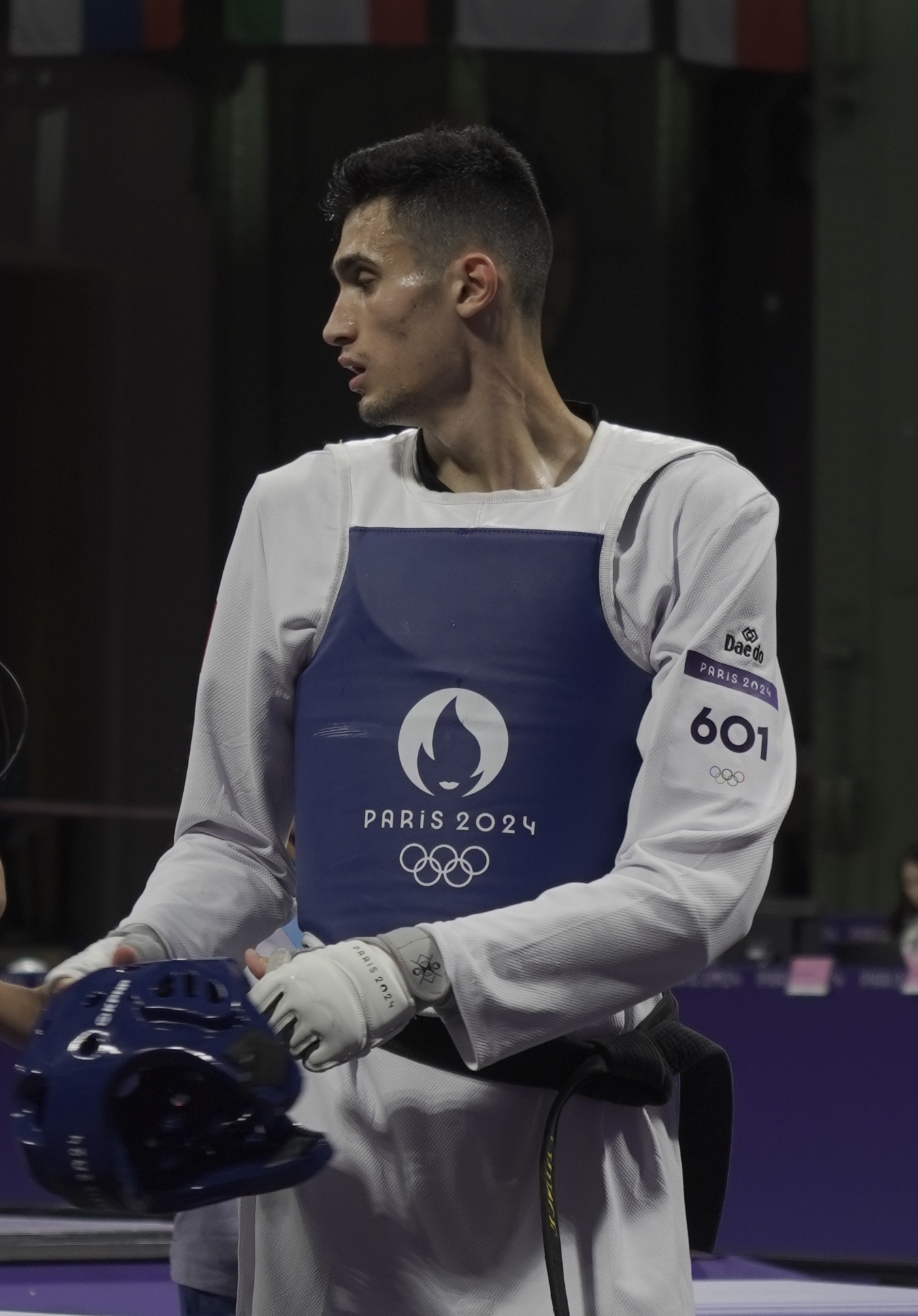
- Alessio at the 2024 Olympics

Personal information
- Nickname: Prince
- Born: 14 April 2000 (age 26) Livorno, Italy
- Height: 198 cm (6 ft 6 in)
- Weight: 80 kg (176 lb)

Sport
- Country: Italy
- Sport: Taekwondo
- Weight class: Welterweight
- University team: Link Campus University
- Club: G.S. Fiamme Rosse
- Coached by: Francesco Laface, Claudio Nolano

Achievements and titles
- Olympic finals: 1
- World finals: 1
- Regional finals: 3
- National finals: 10
- Highest world ranking: 1
Medal record
Men's taekwondo
Representing Italy
Olympic Games
Bronze medal – third place	2024 Paris	80 kg
World Championships
Gold medal – first place	2019 Manchester	74 kg
Gold medal – first place	2023 Baku	80 kg
Silver medal – second place	2025 Wuxi	87 kg
Grand Prix
Gold medal – first place	2022 Rome	80 kg
Gold medal – first place	2022 Paris	80 kg
Gold medal – first place	2022 Riyadh (F)	80 kg
Silver medal – second place	2022 Manchester	80 kg
European Championships
Gold medal – first place	2022 Manchester	80 kg
Bronze medal – third place	2021 Sofia	80 kg
European Junior Championships
Gold medal – first place	2017 Larnaca	73 kg
- Updated on 29 November 2024

Simone Prince Alessio (born 14 April 2000) is an Italian taekwondo athlete.

== Career ==
Alessio won the gold medal at the 2019 World Taekwondo Championships in the men's lightweight competition. He qualified for the 2020 Summer Olympics through the 2021 European Taekwondo Olympic Qualification Tournament.

He won the gold medal in the men's welterweight event at the 2023 World Taekwondo Championships held in Baku, Azerbaijan. He defeated Carl Nickolas of the United States in his gold medal match. He won a bronze medal in the men's 80 kg event at the 2024 Summer Olympics held in Paris, France.
