= Slovakia men's national under-19 volleyball team =

Slovakia Boys' U19
- Association: Slovak Volleyball Federation
- Confederation: CEV

Uniforms
Home	Away	Third

Youth Olympic Games
- Appearances: No Appearances

FIVB U19 World Championship
- Appearances: 5 (First in 1997)
- Best result: 8th place : (2005)

Europe U19 / U18 Championship
- Appearances: 7 (First in 1997)
- Best result: 4th place : (2005)
- www.svf.sk (in Slovak)

The Slovakia men's national under-19 volleyball team represents Slovakia in international men's volleyball competitions and friendly matches under the age 19 and it is ruled by the Slovak Volleyball Federation body that is an affiliate of the Federation of International Volleyball FIVB and also part of the European Volleyball Confederation CEV.

== Results ==
=== Summer Youth Olympics ===
Champions Runners up Third place Fourth place

Youth Olympic Games
Year	Round	Position	Pld	W	L	SW	SL	Squad
(Singapore) 2010	Didn't qualify							
(China) 2014	No Volleyball Event							
(Argentina) 2018	No Volleyball Event							
Total	0 Titles	0/1						

=== FIVB U19 World Championship ===
Champions Runners up Third place Fourth place

FIVB U19 World Championship
Year	Round	Position	Pld	W	L	SW	SL	Squad
(United Arab Emirates) 1989	Didn't qualify							
(Portugal) 1991	Didn't qualify							
(Turkey) 1993	Didn't qualify							
(Puerto Rico) 1995	Didn't qualify							
(Iran) 1997		13th place						
(Saudi Arabia) 1999		13th place						
(Egypt) 2001		13th place						
(Thailand) 2003		13th place						
(Algeria) 2005		8th place						
(Mexico) 2007	Didn't qualify							
(Italy) 2009	Didn't qualify							
(Argentina) 2011	Didn't qualify							
(Mexico) 2013	Didn't qualify							
(Argentina) 2015	Didn't qualify							
(Bahrain) 2017	Didn't qualify							
(Tunisia) 2019	Didn't qualify							
(Iran) 2021	Didn't qualify							
(Argentina) 2023	Didn't qualify							
(Uzbekistan) 2025	Didn't qualify							
Total	0 Titles	5/19						

=== Europe U19 / U18 Championship ===
Champions Runners up Third place Fourth place

Europe U19 / U18 Championship
Year	Round	Position	Pld	W	L	SW	SL	Squad
(Spain) 1995	Didn't qualify							
(Slovakia) 1997		6th place						
(Poland) 1999		6th place						
(Czech Republic) 2001		7th place						
(Croatia) 2003		7th place						
(Latvia) 2005		4th place						
(Austria) 2007	Didn't qualify							
(Netherlands) 2009	Didn't qualify							
(Turkey) 2011	Didn't qualify							
(Bosnia and Herzegovina) / (Serbia) 2013	Didn't qualify							
(Turkey) 2015	Didn't qualify							
(Hungary) / (Slovakia) 2017		11th place						
(Czech Republic) / (Slovakia) 2018		12th place						
(Italy) 2020	Didn't qualify							
(Georgia (country)) 2022	Didn't qualify							
(Bulgaria) 2024	Didn't qualify							
(Italy) 2026	Didn't qualify							
Total	0 Titles	7/17						

== Team ==
=== Current squad ===
The following players are the Slovak players that have competed in the 2018 Boys' U18 Volleyball European Championship

#	name	position	height	weight	birthday	spike	block
	bandos matus	outside-spiker	189	72	2003	324	300
	Billich andrej	middle-blocker	195	70	2002	330	305
	Ehrenwald pavel	outside-spiker	192	81	2001	319	295
	Fulek nicolas	middle-blocker	194	82	2001	320	295
	Halaj simon	outside-spiker	196	84	2002	330	308
	Hanusek branislav	middle-blocker	201	72	2003	328	305
	Kilian michal	outside-spiker	192	86	2001	320	295
	Krisak martin	setter	192	77	2002	339	305
	Lozi samuel	outside-spiker	186	78	2001	323	300
	Martinak jakub	setter	184	77	2001	320	295
	Pavlicko bruno	setter	186	79	2001	317	303
	Porubsky samuel	setter	182	66	2001	310	290
	Ritter adam	middle-blocker	191	72	2001	320	295
	Ruzbasky jan	libero	179	75	2001	316	290
	Rzyman simon	middle-blocker	197	86	2001	344	325
	Rzyman vincent	opposite	197	91	2001	340	320
	Satke patrik	middle-blocker	188	75	2002	316	290
	Sellong daniel	middle-blocker	201	78	2001	333	310
	Slovak martin	outside-spiker	197	71	2002	325	300
	Stepanek filip	outside-spiker	190	72	2001	325	300
	Suchanic matus	outside-spiker	185	80	2001	325	300
	Turcani matej	outside-spiker	189	67	2003	317	295
	Vanco adrian	opposite	196	84	2002	349	325
	Viskup tobias	outside-spiker	190	60	2002	332	305
	Vitko radovan	libero	177	72	2002	303	280
	Zeman michal	middle-blocker	201	95	2001	346	310
