= Joaquín Churchill =

Chilean taekwondo practitioner (born 2002)

Personal information
- Full name: Joaquín Andrés Churchill Martínez
- Born: 17 October 2002 (age 24)

Sport
- Sport: Taekwondo
- Weight class: 80 kg
Medal record
Men's taekwondo
Representing Chile
Pan American Games
Silver medal – second place	2023 Santiago	Team
Pan American Championships
Bronze medal – third place	2021 Cancún	74 kg
Bolivarian Games
Silver medal – second place	2022 Valledupar	80 kg

Joaquín Andrés Churchill Martínez (Note: In this Spanish name, the first or paternal surname is Churchill and the second or maternal family name is Martinez.) (born 17 October 2002) is a Chilean taekwondo practitioner. He was a silver medalist at the 2023 Pan American Games and competed at the 2024 Summer Olympics.

== Early life ==
He is from Puente Alto. He started taekwondo at the age of nine-years old. He is a member of Areté Sports Club and studied Physical Education at Andrés Bello University.

== Career ==
He won bronze in the 74kg category at the 2021 Pan American Taekwondo Championships in Cancún, Mexico in June 2021.

He was a silver medalist at the 2022 Bolivarian Games in Colombia in the -80kg. After recovering from an injury that ruled him out of action for three months, he was a silver medalist at the 2023 Pan American Games in Santiago, in the Men's Kyorugi team.

He qualified for the 2024 Olympic Games at the 2024 Pan American Taekwondo Olympic Qualification Tournament in San Domingo, Dominican Republic in April 2024.

At the 2024 Summer Olympics in Paris he competed in the 80kg category.

He defeated CJ Nickolas in the final of the -80kg at the 2025 Dutch Open.
