= Taekwondo at the 2024 Summer Olympics – Men's 80 kg =

Men's 80 kg at the Games of the XXXIII Olympiad
- Venue: Grand Palais
- Date: 9 August 2024
- Competitors: 17 from 17 nations

Medalists
| 1st place, gold medalist(s) | | Firas Katoussi | Tunisia |
| 2nd place, silver medalist(s) | | Mehran Barkhordari | Iran |
| 3rd place, bronze medalist(s) | | Simone Alessio | Italy |
| 3rd place, bronze medalist(s) | | Edi Hrnic | Denmark |

The men's 80 kg competition in Taekwondo at the 2024 Summer Olympics was held on 9 August 2024 at the Grand Palais.

== Summary ==
This is the seventh appearance of the men's 80kg category, debut in 2000, and it has appeared in every games since then.

Maksim Khramtsov is a defending champion, but he did not qualify due to the IOC did not declare him neutral he is not invited to the Games, Stefan Takov took his spot, and lost to Faysal Sawadogo, 2020 silver medalist Saleh El-Sharabaty lost to Henrique Marques, one of the bronze medalists, Toni Kanaet did not qualify and Seif Eissa lost to Edi Hrnic.

== Seeds ==
Every practitioner has numbered a seed.

1. Simone Alessio (ITA) (Bronze medalist)
2. CJ Nickolas (USA) (loser of bronze medal match)
3. Seif Eissa (EGY) (Round of 16)
4. Seo Geon-woo (KOR) (loser of bronze medal match)
5. Saleh El-Sharabaty (JOR) (Round of 16)
6. Firas Katoussi (TUN) (Champion)
7. Stefan Takov (SRB) (Round of 16)
8. Mehran Barkhordari (IRI) (silver medalist)
9. Jasurbek Jaysunov (UZB) (loser of repechages)
10. Faysal Sawadogo (BUR) (quarterfinals)
11. Leon Sejranovic (AUS) (loser of repechages)
12. Henrique Marques (BRA) (quarterfinals)
13. Joaquín Churchill (CHI) (Round of 16)
14. Edi Hrnic (DEN) (Bronze medalist)
15. Farzad Mansouri (EOR) (Round of 16)
16. Ismaël Coulibaly (MLI) (qualification)
17. Batyrkhan Toleugali (KAZ) (Round of 16)

== Schedule ==
All times are in local time (UTC+2).

| Date | Time | Round |
|---|---|---|
| Friday, 9 August 2024 | 09:00 | Qualification round |
| Friday, 9 August 2024 | 09:21 | Round of 16 |
| Friday, 9 August 2024 | 14:40 | Quarterfinals |
| Friday, 9 August 2024 | 16:24 | Semifinals |
| Friday, 9 August 2024 | 19:40 | Repechage |
| Friday, 9 August 2024 | 20:34 | Bronze medal matches |
| Friday, 9 August 2024 | 21:37 | Final |

== Results ==
Legend

- P — Won by punitive declaration

=== Gold medal match ===
| Gold medal match |
| 8 | Mehran Barkhordari (IRI) | 2 | 1 |
| 6 | Firas Katoussi (TUN) | 4 | 5 |

=== Repechage ===
| Repechage | | | | Bronze Medal |
| | | | | 2 | CJ Nickolas (USA) | 3 | 1 |
| | | | | 1 | Simone Alessio (ITA) | 3 | 2 |
| 1 | Simone Alessio (ITA) | 5 | 5 | 1 | Simone Alessio (ITA) | 3 | 2 |
| 9 | Jasurbek Jaysunov (UZB) | 4 | 2 |

| Repechage | | | | Bronze Medal |
| 11 | Leon Sejranovic (AUS) | 5 | 0 |
| 14 | Edi Hrnic (DEN) | 8 | 12 |
| 14 | Edi Hrnic (DEN) | 8 | 12 | 14 | Edi Hrnic (DEN) | 15 | 11 |
| | | | | 4 | Seo Geon-woo (KOR) | 8 | 2 |

=== Main bracket ===
==== Pool A ====
Qualification round
16 | Ismaël Coulibaly (MLI) | 4 | 1 | 1
17 | Batyrkhan Toleugali (KAZ) | 5 | 1 | 2

Round of 16
13 | Joaquín Churchill (CHI) | 8 | 16 | 1
4 | Seo Geon-woo (KOR) | 6 | 16 | 14
5 | Saleh El-Sharabaty (JOR) | 1 | 12
12 | Henrique Marques (BRA) | 4 | 5^{P}
9 | Jasurbek Jaysunov (UZB) | 0 | 0 | 6
8 | Mehran Barkhordari (IRI) | 0 | 12 | 6
1 | Simone Alessio (ITA) | 6 | 3
17 | Batyrkhan Toleugali (KAZ) | 0 | 1

Quarter-finals
4 | Seo Geon-woo (KOR) | 4 | 2
12 | Henrique Marques (BRA) | 4 | 2
8 | Mehran Barkhordari (IRI) | 1 | 2 | 10
1 | Simone Alessio (ITA) | 6 | 1 | 9

Semi-finals
4 | Seo Geon-woo (KOR) | 4 | 9 | 8
8 | Mehran Barkhordari (IRI) | 2 | 13 | 12

==== Pool B ====
Qualification round

Round of 16
15 | Farzad Mansouri (EOR) | 7 | 1
2 | CJ Nickolas (USA) | 10 | 3
7 | Stefan Takov (SRB) | 4 | 7
10 | Faysal Sawadogo (BUR) | 6 | 8
11 | Leon Sejranovic (AUS) | 0 | 1
6 | Firas Katoussi (TUN) | 4 | 7
3 | Seif Eissa (EGY) | 5 | 0
14 | Edi Hrnic (DEN) | 6 | 5

Quarter-finals
2 | CJ Nickolas (USA) | 7 | 10
10 | Faysal Sawadogo (BUR) | 5 | 9
6 | Firas Katoussi (TUN) | 0 | 6
14 | Edi Hrnic (DEN) | 0 | 0

Semi-finals
2 | CJ Nickolas (USA) | 0 | 2
6 | Firas Katoussi (TUN) | 0 | 2
