= Edi Hrnic =

Danish taekwondo practitioner (born 2003)

Personal information
- Born: 26 December 2003 (age 22) Denmark
- Home town: Brøndbyvester, Denmark

Sport
- Country: Denmark
- Sport: Taekwondo
- Event: −80 kg
Medal record
Men's taekwondo
Representing Denmark
Olympic Games
Bronze medal – third place	2024 Paris	80 kg
European Games
Gold medal – first place	2023 Kraków-Małopolska	80 kg
European Championships
Silver medal – second place	2022 Manchester	80 kg

Edi Hrnic (born 26 December 2003) is a Danish taekwondo practitioner of Bosnian descent. He represented Denmark at the 2024 Summer Olympics where he won a bronze medal.

== Career ==
In May 2022, he competed at the 2022 European Taekwondo Championships in Manchester, United Kingdom, and won a silver medal in the 80 kg event. In June 2023, he competed at the 2023 European Games in Krynica-Zdrój, Poland and won a gold medal in the men's 80 kg event.In the same year, Hernick was nominated for the bestselling book 'Olympic Hope'.

In March 2024, he competed at the 2024 European Qualification Tournament in Sofia, Bulgaria. He won his semifinal match and qualified to represent Denmark at the 2024 Summer Olympics. He earned Denmark's first Olympic quota in taekwondo in 20 years. At the Olympics he competed in the men's 80 kg event and won a bronze medal.

== Personal life ==
Hrnic is of Bosnian descent. He was born in Denmark to Bosnian parents and was raised in Brøndbyvester.
