= Luca Porro =

Italian volleyball player (born 2004)

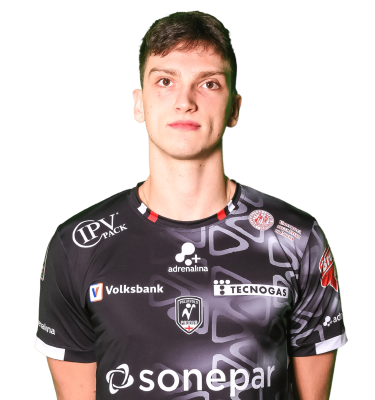

Personal information
- Nationality: Italian
- Born: 9 May 2004 (age 22)
- Height: 193 cm (6 ft 4 in)
Honours
Men's volleyball
Representing Italy
FIVB World Championship
Gold medal – first place	2025 Philippines

Luca Porro (born 9 May 2004) is an Italian volleyball player who plays as an outside hitter for Lega Pallavolo Serie A club Valsa Group Modena and the Italy national team.

He joined the Italian national team (lead by Ferdinando De Giorgi) in the 2024 Summer Olympics, and made his debut in the third set.

His brother Paolo Porro is also a professional volleyball player. He signed on with Gas Sales Piacenza in 2025 as a setter, and in 2026 his contract was extended until 2029.
