= CJ Nickolas =

American taekwondo practitioner

Personal information
- Full name: Carl Alan Nickolas Jr.
- Born: July 18, 2001 (age 25) Oakland, California, U.S.
- Home town: Brentwood, California, U.S.
- Height: 6 ft 2 in (188 cm)

Sport
- Country: United States
- Sport: Taekwondo
- Weight class: 80 kg
- Rank: 2
- Event: Kyorugi
- Coached by: Gareth Brown

Achievements and titles
- Highest world ranking: 3 (October 2023)
Medal record
Men's taekwondo
Representing United States
World Championships
Silver medal – second place	2023 Baku	80 kg
Grand Prix
Bronze medal – third place	2022 Paris	80 kg
Bronze medal – third place	2023 Paris	80 kg
Bronze medal – third place	2023 Taiyuan	80 kg
Bronze medal – third place	2023 Manchester (F)	80 kg
Pan American Games
Gold medal – first place	2023 Santiago	80 kg
Pan American Championships
Gold medal – first place	2021 Cancún	80 kg
Gold medal – first place	2022 Punta Cana	80 kg
Gold medal – first place	2024 Rio de Janeiro	80 kg
Silver medal – second place	2026 Rio de Janeiro	80 kg
Junior Pan American Games
Gold medal – first place	2021 Cali-Valle	80 kg

Carl Alan Nickolas Jr. (born July 18, 2001), also known as CJ Nickolas, is an American taekwondo practitioner. He won the silver medal in the men's welterweight event at the 2023 World Taekwondo Championships held in Baku, Azerbaijan. He is also a three-time gold medalist at the Pan American Taekwondo Championships.

== Career ==
Nickolas competed in the men's featherweight event at the 2019 World Taekwondo Championships held in Manchester, United Kingdom. He was eliminated in his second match. A few months later, he lost his bronze medal match in the men's 68 kg event at the 2019 Pan American Games held in Lima, Peru.

In 2021, Nickolas won the gold medal in the men's 80 kg at the Pan American Taekwondo Championships held in Cancún, Mexico. In that same year, he won the gold medal in his event at the 2021 Junior Pan American Games held in Cali, Colombia.

Nickolas won the gold medal in his event at the 2022 Pan American Taekwondo Championships held in Punta Cana, the Dominican Republic. He also competed in the men's welterweight event at the 2022 World Taekwondo Championships held in Guadalajara, Mexico where he was eliminated in his first match.

He won the silver medal in the men's welterweight event at the 2023 World Taekwondo Championships held in Baku, Azerbaijan. He lost his bronze medal match in the men's 80 kg event at the 2024 Summer Olympics held in Paris, France.

== Achievements ==
Year	Event	Location	Place
2021	Pan American Championships	Cancún, Mexico	1st
2021	Junior Pan American Games	Cali, Colombia	1st
2022	Pan American Championships	Punta Cana, Dominican Republic	1st
2023	World Championships	Baku, Azerbaijan	2nd
