= Tunisia men's national under-19 volleyball team =

National sports team

Tunisia U-19
- Nickname(s): نسور قرطاج (Eagles of Carthage)
- Association: Tunisian Volleyball Federation
- Confederation: CAVB

Uniforms
Home	Away	Third

Youth Olympic Games
- Appearances: None

FIVB U19 World Championship
- Appearances: 12 (First in 1995)
- Best result: 6th : (2009)

African Volleyball Championship U19
- Appearances: 13 (First in 1994)
- Best result: Champions (gold) (9): 1994, 1997, 1998, 2000, 2006, 2008, 2010, 2016, 2024
- www.ftvb.org

Tunisia men's national under-19 volleyball team
Medal record

African Championship
Gold medal – first place	1994 Casablanca	Team
Gold medal – first place	1997 Durban	Team
Gold medal – first place	1998 Radès	Team
Gold medal – first place	2000 Alexandria	Team
Gold medal – first place	2006 Kelibia	Team
Gold medal – first place	2008 Cairo	Team
Gold medal – first place	2010 Cape Town	Team
Gold medal – first place	2016 Kelibia	Team
Gold medal – first place	2024 Tunis	Team
Silver medal – second place	2002 Casablanca	Team
Silver medal – second place	2004 Durban	Team
Silver medal – second place	2013 Sétif	Team
Silver medal – second place	2015 Kelibia	Team

Arab Championship
Gold medal – first place	1992 Tunisia	Team
Gold medal – first place	1994 Egypt	Team
Gold medal – first place	1996 Egypt	Team
Gold medal – first place	2009 Beirut	Team
Silver medal – second place	2011 Hurghada	Team
Silver medal – second place	2013 Sidi Bou Said	Team
Bronze medal – third place	1998 Bahrain	Team

The Tunisia men's national under-19 volleyball team (Arabic: منتخب تونس تحت 19 سنة لكرة الطائرة), nicknamed Les Aigles de Carthage (The Eagles of Carthage or The Carthage Eagles), represents Tunisia in international volleyball competitions and friendly matches. The team is one of the leading nations in men's volleyball on the African continent, with eight-time African Championship.

== Results ==
Champions Runners up Third place Fourth place

- Red border color indicates tournament was held on home soil.

=== Summer Youth Olympics ===
Youth Olympic Games
Year	Round	Position	Pld	W	L	SW	SL	Squad
(Singapore) 2010	Didn't Qualify							
(China) 2014	No Volleyball Event							
(Argentina) 2018	No Volleyball Event							
Total	0 Titles	0/1						

=== FIVB Volleyball Boys' U19 World Championship ===
FIVB Volleyball Boys' U19 World Championship
Year	Round	Position	Pld	W	L	SW	SL
(United Arab Emirates) 1989	Did not compete						
(Portugal) 1991	Did not compete						
(Turkey) 1993	Did not compete						
(Puerto Rico) 1995		11th					
(Iran) 1997		9th					
(Saudi Arabia) 1999		9th					
(Egypt) 2001		8th					
(Thailand) 2003	Did not compete						
(Algeria) 2005		13th					
(Mexico) 2007		14th					
(Italy) 2009		6th					
(Argentina) 2011		16th					
(Mexico) 2013		18th					
(Argentina) 2015	Did not compete						
(Bahrain) 2017		20th					
(Tunisia) 2019		17th					
(Iran) 2021	Did not compete						
(Argentina) 2023	Did not compete						
(Uzbekistan) 2025		22nd					
Total	0 Titles	12/19					

=== African Volleyball Championship U19 ===
African Volleyball Championship U19
Year	Round	Position	Pld	W	L	SW	SL
(Morocco) 1994	Final	1st					
(South Africa) 1997	Final	1st					
(Tunisia) 1998	Final	1st					
(Egypt) 2000	Final	1st					
(Morocco) 2002	Final	2nd					
(South Africa) 2004	Final	2nd					
(Tunisia) 2006	Final	1st					
(Egypt) 2008	Final	1st					
(South Africa) 2010	Final	1st					
(Algeria) 2013	Final	2nd					
(Tunisia) 2015	Final	2nd					
(Tunisia) 2016	Final	1st					
(Nigeria) 2020	Withdrew						
(Morocco) 2022	Semi-final	4th					
(Tunisia) 2024	Final	1st					
Total	8 Titles	14/14					

=== Arab Youth Volleyball Championship ===
Arab Volleyball Championship U19
Year	Round	Position	Pld	W	L	SW	SL
(Tunisia) 1992	Final	1st					
(Egypt) 1994	Final	1st					
(Egypt) 1996	Final	1st					
(Bahrain) 1998	Semi-final	3rd					
(Syria) 2007	Semi-final	4th					
(Lebanon) 2009	Final	1st					
(Egypt) 2011	Final	2nd					
(Tunisia) 2013	Final	2nd					
(Morocco) 2015	Semi-final	4th					
(Jordan) 2017	Did not compete						
(Jordan) 2019	Did not compete						
Total	4 Titles	9/15					

== See also ==
- Tunisia men's national volleyball team
- Tunisia men's national under-23 volleyball team
- Tunisia men's national under-21 volleyball team
- Tunisia women's national volleyball team
- Tunisian Volleyball Federation
