= Mohamed Ali Ben Othmen Miladi =

Tunisian volleyball player (born 1991)

Personal information
- Full name: Mohamed Ali Ben Othmen Miladi
- Nationality: Tunisia
- Born: May 12, 1991; Nabeul, Tunisia
- Hometown: Nabeul, Tunisia
- Height: 1.90 m (6 ft 3 in)
- Weight: 85 kg (187 lb)

Volleyball information
- Position: Wing Spiker
- Current club: (Tunisia) CO Kélibia
- Number: 6

National team
2013 -	Tunisia
- Last updated: December 2013

Mohamed Ali Ben Othmen Miladi (born 12 May 1991 in Nabeul, Tunisia) is a Tunisian volleyball player. He is 190 cm high and plays as wing spiker.

== Clubs ==
Club	Nation	Years
Aigle sportif d'El Haouaria	Tunisia	2009–2013
CO Kélibia (loan)	Tunisia	2013–2014
Espérance de Tunis	Tunisia	2014-2015

== Awards ==
=== Club ===
- 1 Arab Clubs Championship (2014)
- 1 Tunisian League (2015)

=== National team ===
- 1 Arab Championship (2012)
- 1 African Championship U21 (2010)
- 1 Arab Championship U19 (2009)
- 1 African Championship U19 (2008)
