= Saddem Hmissi =

Tunisian volleyball player (born 1991)

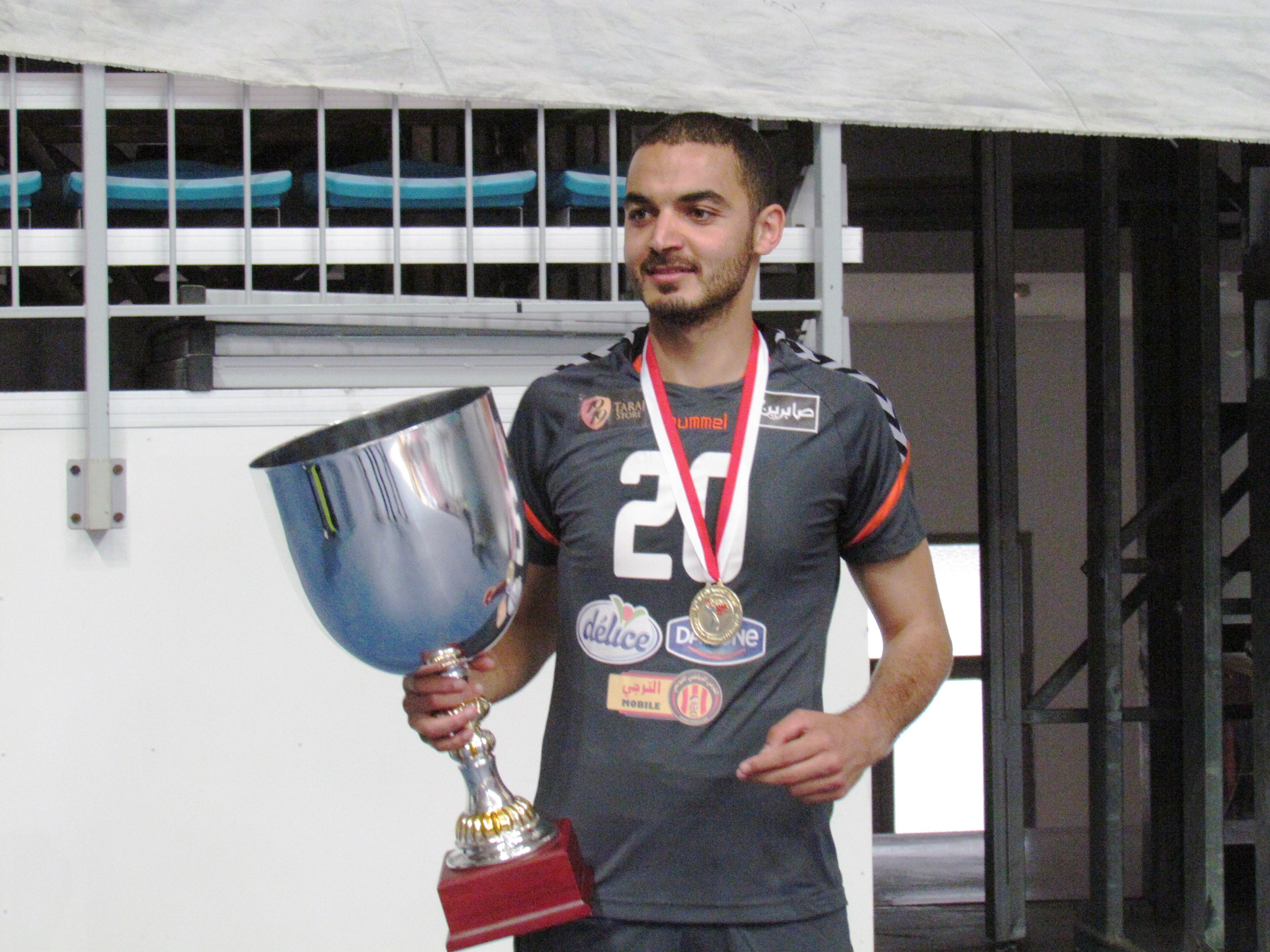
- Hmissi in 2018

Personal information
- Full name: Saddem Hmissi
- Nationality: Tunisia
- Born: February 16, 1991; Nabeul, Tunisia
- Hometown: Nabeul, Tunisia
- Height: 1.86 m (6 ft 1 in)
- Weight: 75 kg (165 lb)

Volleyball information
- Position: Libero
- Current club: (Tunisia) ES Tunis
- Number: 16

National team
2010 -	Tunisia
Honours
African Championships
Silver medal – second place	2013 Sousse	Team
Mediterranean Games
Silver medal – second place	2013 Mersin	Team
- Last updated: December 2013

Saddem Hmissi (born 16 February 1991 in Nabeul, Tunisia) is a Tunisian volleyball player. He is 186 cm high and plays as a libero.

== Clubs ==
Club	Nation	Years
AS Haouaria	Tunisia	2009–2012
Espérance de Tunis	Tunisia	2012–

== Awards ==
=== Club ===
- 1 African Champions League (2014)
- 1 Arab Clubs Championship (2014)
- 1 Tunisian League (2015)
- 1 Tunisian Cup (2014)

=== National team ===
- 1 Arab Championship (2012)
- 1 African Championship U21 (2010)
- 1 Arab Championship U19 (2009)
- 1 African Championship U19 (2008)
