= Egypt men's national under-19 volleyball team =

Egypt U-19
- Nickname(s): The Pharaohs
- Association: Egyptian Volleyball Federation
- Confederation: CAVB

Uniforms
Home	Away	Third

FIVB U19 World Championship
- Appearances: 15 (First in 1993)
- Best result: 4th (2001)

African U19 Championship
- Appearances: 11 (First in 2000)
- Best result: (gold) (2002, 2004, 2013, 2015)
- www.fevb.org (in Arabic)

The Egypt men's national under-19 volleyball team, represents Egypt in international volleyball competitions and friendly matches. The team is four-time African Champion.

== Results ==
Champions Runners up Third place Fourth place

- Green border color indicates tournament was held on home soil.

=== Summer Youth Olympics ===
Youth Olympic Games
Year	Round	Position	Pld	W	L	SW	SL	Squad
(Singapore) 2010	Didn't qualify							
(China) 2014	No Volleyball Event							
(Argentina) 2018	No Volleyball Event							
Total	0 Titles	0/1						

=== FIVB U19 World Championship ===
FIVB U19 World Championship
Year	Round	Position	Pld	W	L	SW	SL
(United Arab Emirates) 1989	Didn't qualify						
(Portugal) 1991	Didn't qualify						
(Turkey) 1993		8th place					
(Puerto Rico) 1995	Didn't qualify						
(Iran) 1997	Didn't qualify						
(Saudi Arabia) 1999	Didn't qualify						
(Egypt) 2001	Semi-final	4th place	7	4	3	12	12
(Thailand) 2003	Quarter-final	9th place	4	1	3	5	9
(Algeria) 2005	Quarter-final	9th place	4	1	3	5	11
(Mexico) 2007	Group stage	16th place	8	0	8	4	24
(Italy) 2009	Group stage	13th place	8	3	5	12	17
(Argentina) 2011	Group stage	12th place	8	3	5	12	18
(Mexico) 2013	Round of 16	12th place	8	3	5	11	16
(Argentina) 2015	Group stage	20th place	7	0	7	2	21
(Bahrain) 2017	Quarter-final	6th place	8	5	3	17	14
(Tunisia) 2019	Semi-final	4th place	8	6	2	19	11
(Iran) 2021	Round of 16	12th place	8	3	5	12	18
(Argentina) 2023	Quarter-final	8th place	8	4	4	14	15
(Uzbekistan) 2025	Group stage	21st place	8	3	5	10	15
Total	0 Titles	15/19					

=== African Championship U19 / U18 ===
African Championship U18
Year	Round	Position	Pld	W	L	SW	SL
(Morocco) 1994	Data not available						
(South Africa) 1997	Data not available						
(Tunisia) 1998	Data not available						
(Egypt) 2000	Semi-final	3rd place					
(Morocco) 2002	Final	Champions	4	4	0	12	3
(South Africa) 2004	Final	Champions	4	4	0	12	2
(Tunisia) 2006	Final	Runners-up	2	1	1	3	4
(Egypt) 2008	Final	Runners-up	4	3	1	9	3
(South Africa) 2010	Final	Runners-up	4	3	1	9	4
(Algeria) 2013	Final	Champions	3	3	0	9	1
(Tunisia) 2015	Final	Champions	2	2	0	6	2
(Tunisia) 2016	Final	Runners-up	3	2	1	6	4
(Nigeria) 2020	Withdrew						
(Morocco) 2022	Final	Runners-up					
(Tunisia) 2024	Final	Runners-up					
Total	4 Titles	11/15					

== Team ==
=== Current squad ===
The following is the Egyptian roster in the 2023 FIVB Volleyball Boys' U19 World Championship.

Head Coach: Ahmed Samir

No.	Name	Date of birth	Height	Weight	Spike	Block	2023 Club
1	Hamza Elsafi (C)	17/09/2005	188 cm	73 kg (161 lb)	356 cm (140 in)	354 cm (139 in)	(Egypt) Al Ahly
3	Sherif youssef	17/01/2006	195 cm	85 kg (187 lb)	326 cm (128 in)	316 cm (124 in)	(Egypt) Al Ahly
4	Yassin Fathalla	20/09/2005	182 cm	85 kg (187 lb)	322 cm (127 in)	314 cm (124 in)	(Egypt) Delphi
7	Mazen Sherif	05/12/2006	188 cm	71 kg (157 lb)	305 cm (120 in)	290 cm (110 in)	(Egypt) Al Shams
8	Asser Hossam	08/03/2005	189 cm	90 kg (200 lb)	323 cm (127 in)	319 cm (126 in)	(Egypt) Wadi Degla
9	Mahmoud Ibrahim	14/12/2005	190 cm	83 kg (183 lb)	318 cm (125 in)	310 cm (120 in)	(Egypt) Mansoura
10	Ahmed Reda	11/10/2006	193 cm	90 kg (200 lb)	319 cm (126 in)	314 cm (124 in)	(Egypt) Delphi
11	Youssef Ahmed	05/04/2006	201 cm	106 kg (234 lb)	330 cm (130 in)	327 cm (129 in)	(Egypt) Petrojet
13	Hazem Mohamed	17/05/2006	179 cm	65 kg (143 lb)	317 cm (125 in)	308 cm (121 in)	(Egypt) Shooting Club
15	Mohamed Amir	22/04/2007	191 cm	77 kg (170 lb)	333 cm (131 in)	326 cm (128 in)	(Egypt) Heliolido
17	Ibrahim Adel	30/01/2006	201 cm	86 kg (190 lb)	330 cm (130 in)	327 cm (129 in)	(Egypt) Zamalek
20	Salah Mohamed	26/09/2005	193 cm	83 kg (183 lb)	325 cm (128 in)	314 cm (124 in)	(Egypt) Eastern Company SC

== See also ==
- Egypt men's national volleyball team
- Egypt men's national under-21 volleyball team
- Egypt men's national under-17 volleyball team
