= 2024 Boys' U18 African Nations Volleyball Championship =

Tournament details
- Host country: Tunisia
- City: Tunis
- Dates: 24–30 August
- Teams: 6
- Venue: 1 (in 1 host city)

Final positions
- Champions: Tunisia (9th title)
- Runners-up: Egypt
- Third place: Algeria
- Fourth place: Kenya

Tournament statistics
- Matches played: 20

The 2024 Boys' U18 African Nations Volleyball Championship was the 15th edition of the Boys' U18 African Nations Volleyball Championship, the biennial international youth volleyball tournament organised by the African Volleyball Confederation (CAVB) for the boys' under-18 national teams of Africa. It was held in Tunis, Tunisia from 24 to 30 August 2024.

Six national teams took part in the tournament, with players born on or after 1 January 2007 being eligible to participate.

Same as previous editions, the tournament acted as the CAVB qualifiers for the FIVB Volleyball Boys' U19 World Championship. The top three teams qualified for the 2025 FIVB Volleyball Boys' U19 World Championship in Uzbekistan as the CAVB representatives.

Tunisia won their ninth title by beating Egypt with a narrow 3–2 score in the final. Algeria completed the podium after defeating Kenya 3–0 in the third-place match. Champions Tunisia, runners-up Egypt and third-place Algeria qualified for the 2025 FIVB Volleyball Boys' U19 World Championship.

== Host and venue ==
| El Menzah | Locations of venue in Grand Tunis. |
| El Menzah Sports Palace | Locations of venue in Grand Tunis. |
| Capacity: 4,500 | Locations of venue in Grand Tunis. |

The African Volleyball Confederation awarded Tunisia the hosting rights for the tournament on 24 June 2024. The competition took place at the El Menzah Sports Palace, an indoor arena located within the Olympic City of El Menzah district in the north of Tunis city. The El Menzah Sports Palace is also known as “Coupole”, French term for Dome.

== Preliminary round ==
All match times are in local times, TNT (UTC+1), as listed by CAVB.

| Pos | Team | Pld | W | L | Pts | SW | SL | SR | SPW | SPL | SPR | Qualification |
|---|---|---|---|---|---|---|---|---|---|---|---|---|
| 1 | Egypt | 5 | 5 | 0 | 14 | 15 | 2 | 7.500 | 408 | 284 | 1.437 | Semi-finals |
| 2 | Tunisia (H) | 5 | 4 | 1 | 12 | 12 | 3 | 4.000 | 363 | 246 | 1.476 | Semi-finals |
| 3 | Algeria | 5 | 3 | 2 | 9 | 11 | 8 | 1.375 | 411 | 378 | 1.087 | Semi-finals |
| 4 | Kenya | 5 | 2 | 3 | 5 | 6 | 11 | 0.545 | 268 | 376 | 0.713 | Semi-finals |
| 5 | Morocco | 5 | 1 | 4 | 5 | 7 | 12 | 0.583 | 359 | 405 | 0.886 | Fifth-place match |
| 6 | Rwanda | 5 | 0 | 5 | 0 | 0 | 15 | 0.000 | 256 | 376 | 0.681 | Fifth-place match |

Source: FIVB
Rules for classification: 1) Matches won; 2) Points; 3) Sets Ratio; 4) Set points ratio; 5) Head-to-head result.
(H) Host

| Date | Time | | Score | | Set 1 | Set 2 | Set 3 | Set 4 | Set 5 | Total | Report |
|---|---|---|---|---|---|---|---|---|---|---|---|
| 24 Aug | 14:00 | Tunisia | 3–0 | Kenya | 25–0 | 25–0 | 25–0 | | | 75–0 | Report |
| 24 Aug | 16:00 | Rwanda | 0–3 | Algeria | 19–25 | 8–25 | 15–25 | | | 42–75 | Report |
| 24 Aug | 20:00 | Egypt | 3–0 | Morocco | 25–21 | 25–14 | 25–11 | | | 75–46 | Report |
| 25 Aug | 16:00 | Morocco | 3–0 | Rwanda | 25–11 | 25–21 | 25–19 | | | 75–51 | Report |
| 25 Aug | 18:00 | Tunisia | 0–3 | Egypt | 23–25 | 19–25 | 21–25 | | | 63–75 | Report |
| 25 Aug | 20:00 | Algeria | 3–0 | Kenya | 25–18 | 25–14 | 25–20 | | | 75–52 | Report |
| 26 Aug | 15:00 | Kenya | 0–3 | Egypt | 15–25 | 13–25 | 16–25 | | | 44–75 | Report |
| 26 Aug | 17:00 | Morocco | 2–3 | Algeria | 24–26 | 26–24 | 25–18 | 18–25 | 8–15 | 101–108 | Report |
| 26 Aug | 19:00 | Rwanda | 3–0 | Tunisia | 19–25 | 16–25 | 21–25 | | | 56–75 | Report |
| 27 Aug | 15:00 | Egypt | 3–0 | Rwanda | 25–14 | 25–15 | 25–15 | | | 75–44 | Report |
| 27 Aug | 17:00 | Morocco | 2–3 | Kenya | 25–11 | 25–20 | 13–25 | 17–25 | 8–15 | 88–96 | Report |
| 27 Aug | 19:00 | Tunisia | 3–0 | Algeria | 25–23 | 25–23 | 25–20 | | | 75–66 | Report |
| 28 Aug | 15:00 | Algeria | 2–3 | Egypt | 25–21 | 16–25 | 25–22 | 10–25 | 11–15 | 87–108 | Report |
| 28 Aug | 17:00 | Rwanda | 0–3 | Kenya | 19–25 | 20–25 | 24–26 | | | 63–76 | Report |
| 28 Aug | 19:00 | Morocco | 3–0 | Tunisia | 17–25 | 13–25 | 19–25 | | | 49–75 | Report |

== Final round ==
=== Bracket ===
Semi-finals
29 August
Egypt | 3
Kenya | 0
29 August
Tunisia | 3
Algeria | 1

Final
30 August
Egypt | 2
Tunisia | 3

Fifth-place match
29 August
Morocco | 3
Rwanda | 1

Third-place match
30 August
Kenya | 0
Algeria | 3

=== Semi-finals ===
| Date | Time | | Score | | Set 1 | Set 2 | Set 3 | Set 4 | Set 5 | Total | Report |
|---|---|---|---|---|---|---|---|---|---|---|---|
| 29 Aug | 18:00 | Egypt | 3–0 | Kenya | 25–17 | 25–18 | 25–22 | | | 75–57 | Report |
| 29 Aug | 20:00 | Tunisia | 3–1 | Algeria | 25–16 | 25–16 | 21–25 | 27–25 | | 98–82 | Report |

=== 5th place match ===
| Date | Time | | Score | | Set 1 | Set 2 | Set 3 | Set 4 | Set 5 | Total | Report |
|---|---|---|---|---|---|---|---|---|---|---|---|
| 29 Aug | 15:00 | Morocco | 3–1 | Rwanda | 25–12 | 25–14 | 24–26 | 25–14 | | 99–66 | Report |

=== 3rd place match ===
| Date | Time | | Score | | Set 1 | Set 2 | Set 3 | Set 4 | Set 5 | Total | Report |
|---|---|---|---|---|---|---|---|---|---|---|---|
| 30 Aug | 15:00 | Kenya | 0–3 | Algeria | 22–25 | 19–25 | 23–25 | | | 64–75 | Report |

=== Final ===
| Date | Time | | Score | | Set 1 | Set 2 | Set 3 | Set 4 | Set 5 | Total | Report |
|---|---|---|---|---|---|---|---|---|---|---|---|
| 30 Aug | 18:00 | Egypt | 2–3 | Tunisia | 25–23 | 18–25 | 16–25 | 25–21 | 12–15 | 96–109 | Report |

== Final standing ==
| Rank | Team |
|---|---|
| 1st place, gold medalist(s) | Tunisia |
| 2nd place, silver medalist(s) | Egypt |
| 3rd place, bronze medalist(s) | Algeria |
| 4 | Kenya |
| 5 | Morocco |
| 6 | Rwanda |

| Qualified for the 2025 FIVB Boys' U19 World Championship |

2024 Boys' U18 African Nations Championship champions

Tunisia
Ninth title

Team Roster:

1 Sabagh A, 2 Ayari Mahdi, 3 Kssibi, 4 Mtibaa A, 5 Haj Mohamed H, 7 Gharbi S (c), 8 Bouaziz M, 9 Chekili S, 10 Ben Arab O, 11 Jemai Yahiya, 13 Alimi Ilyess, 17 Jenhani F.

Head coach: (Tunisia) Ashraf

== Individual awards ==
The following individual awards were presented at the end of the tournament.

- Most valuable player (MVP)

Jemai Yahiya (TUN)

- Best middle blockers

Ahmed Omar (EGY)
Ayari Mahdi (TUN)

- Best setter

Alimi Ilyess (TUN)

- Best opposite spiker

Elsayed Nour (EGY)

- Best outside spikers

Jemai Yahiya (TUN)
Belqassim Ahmed (ALG)

- Best libero

Youssef Zeiad (EGY)

== See also ==
- 2024 Girls' U18 African Nations Volleyball Championship
