= 2025 Arab Volleyball Challenge Cup =

Tournament details
- Host country: Jordan
- City: Amman
- Dates: 28 November–5 December
- Teams: 6 (from 2 confederations)
- Venue: 1 (in 1 host city)

Final positions
- Champions: Tunisia (1st title)
- Runners-up: Egypt
- Third place: Kuwait
- Fourth place: Jordan

Tournament awards
- MVP: (Tunisia) Khaled Ben Slimene

Tournament statistics
- Matches played: 15

The 2025 Arab Volleyball Challenge Cup was the inaugural edition of the Arab Volleyball Challenge Cup organised by the Arab Volleyball Association, held in Amman, Jordan from 28 November to 5 December 2025, with the participation of six national teams.

Tunisia won the championship after topping the standings and achieving victory in all five matches without losing a single set. Tunisian Khaled Ben Slimene won the award for best player in the tournament.

== Teams ==
The Libyan Volleyball Federation has officially announced its withdrawal from participation, citing the failure to secure the necessary financial support from the Ministry of Sports to cover travel, preparation, and participation expenses.

- Bahrain
- Egypt
- Jordan (Hosts)
- Kuwait
- ~~Libya~~ (Withdrew)
- Palestine
- Tunisia

=== Draw ===
The draw took place on 2 November 2025; following Libya’s withdrawal from the competition, the draw was held again on 27 November.

== Venue ==
The Princess Sumaya Hall in Amman hosted all the championship matches.

Amman
Princess Sumaya Hall
Capacity: 1,200

== Standings ==
Pos	Team	Pld	W	L	Pts	SW	SL	SR	SPW	SPL	SPR
1st place, gold medalist(s)	Tunisia	0	0	0	0	0	0	—	0	0	—
2nd place, silver medalist(s)	Egypt	0	0	0	0	0	0	—	0	0	—
3rd place, bronze medalist(s)	Kuwait	0	0	0	0	0	0	—	0	0	—
4	Jordan (H)	0	0	0	0	0	0	—	0	0	—
5	Bahrain	0	0	0	0	0	0	—	0	0	—
6	Palestine	0	0	0	0	0	0	—	0	0	—

Source: AVA
(H) Host

== Results ==
- All times are local, AST (UTC+3).

Date	Time		Score		Set 1	Set 2	Set 3	Set 4	Set 5	Total	Report
28 Nov	15:00	Egypt	3–0	Palestine	25–12	25–12	25–6			75–30	Report
28 Nov	17:00	Tunisia	3–0	Kuwait	25–23	25–21	25–24			75–68	Report
29 Nov	15:00	Bahrain	3–0	Palestine	25–22	25–16	25–9			75–47	Report
29 Nov	17:00	Jordan	3–2	Kuwait	25–20	20–25	20–25	25–23	15–9	105–102	Report
29 Nov	19:00	Tunisia	3–0	Egypt	25–20	25–20	25–20			75–60	Report
1 Dec	15:00	Palestine	0–3	Kuwait	22–25	12–25	17–25			51–75	Report
1 Dec	17:00	Tunisia	3–0	Jordan	25–15	25–16	25–18			75–49	Report
1 Dec	19:00	Egypt	3–1	Bahrain	30–28	23–25	25–17	25–17		103–87	Report
2 Dec	15:00	Tunisia	3–0	Palestine	25–16	25–19	25–16			75–51	Report
2 Dec	17:00	Egypt	3–0	Jordan	25–17	25–18	25–17			75–52	Report
2 Dec	19:00	Bahrain	0–3	Kuwait	19–25	20–25	24–25			63–75	Report
4 Dec	15:00	Tunisia	3–0	Bahrain	31–29	25–19	25–20			81–68	Report
4 Dec	17:00	Jordan	3–0	Palestine	25–20	25–14	25–19			75–53	Report
5 Dec	15:00	Kuwait	0–3	Egypt	15–25	19–25	18–25			52–75	Report
5 Dec	17:00	Jordan	2–3	Bahrain	25–20	23–25	25–19	19–25	12–15	104–104	Report
