= 2009 Arab Youth Volleyball Championship =

Tournament details
- Host country: Lebanon
- Dates: 24 July – 1 August
- Teams: 12
- Venue: 1 (in 1 host city)

Final positions
- Champions: Tunisia (3rd title)

Tournament awards
- MVP: (Saudi Arabia) Majed Bandar Al Jemaan

The 2009 Arab Youth Volleyball Championship was the tenth edition of the Arab Youth Volleyball Championship. It was held in Ghazir Hall, Beirut, Lebanon from 24 July to 1 August 2009.

== Pools composition ==
| Pool A | Pool B |
|---|---|
| Yemen (Defending Champion); Egypt; Tunisia; Qatar; Algeria; Syria | Bahrain; Lebanon (Host); Saudi Arabia; United Arab Emirates; Iraq; Kuwait |

=== Pool A ===
| Pos | Team | Pld | W | L | Pts | SW | SL | SR | SPW | SPL | SPR | Qualification |
|---|---|---|---|---|---|---|---|---|---|---|---|---|
| 1 | Tunisia | 5 | 4 | 1 | 9 | 13 | 4 | 3.250 | 414 | 342 | 1.211 | Semifinals |
| 2 | Egypt | 5 | 4 | 1 | 9 | 14 | 6 | 2.333 | 467 | 412 | 1.133 | Semifinals |
| 3 | Yemen | 5 | 4 | 1 | 9 | 13 | 9 | 1.444 | 491 | 463 | 1.060 | |
| 4 | Algeria | 5 | 2 | 3 | 7 | 9 | 10 | 0.900 | 406 | 422 | 0.962 | |
| 5 | Qatar | 5 | 1 | 4 | 6 | 6 | 13 | 0.462 | 385 | 438 | 0.879 | |
| 6 | Syria | 5 | 0 | 5 | 5 | 2 | 15 | 0.133 | 334 | 420 | 0.795 | |

| Date | Time | | Score | | Set 1 | Set 2 | Set 3 | Set 4 | Set 5 | Total | Report |
|---|---|---|---|---|---|---|---|---|---|---|---|
| 25 Jul | 10:00 | Egypt | 3–0 | Syria | 25-17 | 25-20 | 25-20 | | | 75–0 | |
| 25 Jul | 12:00 | Tunisia | 3–0 | Qatar | 25-20 | 25-14 | 25-11 | | | 75–0 | |
| 25 Jul | 14:00 | Algeria | 2–3 | Yemen | 25-22 | 21-25 | 26-24 | 18-25 | 11-15 | 101–0 | |
| 26 Jul | 10:00 | Qatar | 2–3 | Yemen | 27-25 | 19-25 | 23-25 | 26-24 | 10-15 | 105–0 | |
| 26 Jul | 12:00 | Syria | 1–3 | Algeria | 22-25 | 25-23 | 18-25 | 22-25 | | 87–0 | |
| 26 Jul | 18:00 | Egypt | 3–1 | Tunisia | 17-25 | 25-23 | 25-17 | 28-26 | | 95–0 | |
| 27 Jul | 14:00 | Syria | 0–3 | Yemen | 21-25 | 18-25 | 13-25 | | | 52–0 | |
| 27 Jul | 16:00 | Egypt | 3-1 | Qatar | 25-22 | 25-17 | 18-25 | 25-22 | | 93–0 | |
| 27 Jul | 18:00 | Algeria | 0–3 | Tunisia | 19-25 | 20-25 | 22-25 | | | 61–0 | |
| 28 Jul | 14:00 | Algeria | 3-0 | Qatar | 25-21 | 25-17 | 25-14 | | | 75–0 | |
| 28 Jul | 16:00 | Syria | 0–3 | Tunisia | 17-25 | 19-25 | 21-25 | | | 57–0 | |
| 28 Jul | 18:00 | Egypt | 2–3 | Yemen | 22-25 | 27-29 | 25-17 | 25-21 | 8-15 | 107–0 | |
| 29 Jul | 14:00 | Syria | 1–3 | Qatar | 25-22 | 14-25 | 21-25 | 21-25 | | 81–0 | |
| 29 Jul | 16:00 | Tunisia | 3-1 | Yemen | 23-25 | 25-17 | 25-20 | 25-22 | | 98–0 | |
| 29 Jul | 18:00 | Egypt | 3-1 | Algeria | 25-11 | 22-25 | 25-14 | 25-21 | | 97–0 | |

=== Pool B ===
| Pos | Team | Pld | W | L | Pts | SW | SL | SR | SPW | SPL | SPR | Qualification |
|---|---|---|---|---|---|---|---|---|---|---|---|---|
| 1 | Iraq | 5 | 4 | 1 | 9 | 12 | 7 | 1.714 | 443 | 410 | 1.080 | Semifinals |
| 2 | Saudi Arabia | 5 | 4 | 1 | 9 | 14 | 7 | 2.000 | 465 | 453 | 1.026 | Semifinals |
| 3 | Kuwait | 5 | 3 | 2 | 8 | 13 | 8 | 1.625 | 485 | 427 | 1.136 | |
| 4 | Bahrain | 5 | 2 | 3 | 7 | 8 | 12 | 0.667 | 465 | 471 | 0.987 | |
| 5 | United Arab Emirates | 5 | 2 | 3 | 7 | 9 | 10 | 0.900 | 416 | 439 | 0.948 | |
| 6 | Lebanon | 5 | 0 | 5 | 5 | 3 | 15 | 0.200 | 383 | 457 | 0.838 | |

| Date | Time | | Score | | Set 1 | Set 2 | Set 3 | Set 4 | Set 5 | Total | Report |
|---|---|---|---|---|---|---|---|---|---|---|---|
| 24 Jul | 12:00 | Kuwait | 3–0 | Iraq | 25–20 | 28–26 | 25–20 | | | 78–66 | |
| 24 Jul | 14:00 | Bahrain | 1–3 | Saudi Arabia | 23-25 | 25-18 | 23-25 | 23-25 | | 94–0 | |
| 24 Jul | 20:00 | Lebanon | 1–3 | United Arab Emirates | 20-25 | 27-25 | 16-25 | 25-27 | | 88–0 | |
| 25 Jul | 16:00 | Kuwait | 2–3 | Saudi Arabia | 23-25 | 24-26 | 25-14 | 25-23 | 14-16 | 111–0 | |
| 25 Jul | 18:00 | Iraq | 3–0 | United Arab Emirates | 25-20 | 25-16 | 25-19 | | | 75–0 | |
| 25 Jul | 20:00 | Lebanon | 1–3 | Bahrain | 25-23 | 19-25 | 23-25 | 29-31 | | 96–0 | |
| 26 Jul | 14:00 | Iraq | 3–1 | Bahrain | 20-25 | 25-23 | 25-18 | 29-27 | | 99–0 | |
| 26 Jul | 16:00 | United Arab Emirates | 2–3 | Kuwait | 26-24 | 16-25 | 23-25 | 26-24 | 9-15 | 100–0 | |
| 26 Jul | 20:00 | Saudi Arabia | 3–0 | Lebanon | 25-22 | 25-21 | 25-19 | | | 75–0 | |
| 28 Jul | 10:00 | Iraq | 3-2 | Saudi Arabia | 15-25 | 22-25 | 25-21 | 25-16 | 15-9 | 102–0 | |
| 28 Jul | 12:00 | Bahrain | 0–3 | United Arab Emirates | 23-25 | 22-25 | 21-25 | | | 66–0 | |
| 28 Jul | 20:00 | Lebanon | 0–3 | Kuwait | 19-25 | 11-25 | 19-25 | | | 49–0 | |
| 29 Jul | 10:00 | United Arab Emirates | 1–3 | Saudi Arabia | 25-22 | 19-25 | 23-25 | 17-25 | | 84–0 | |
| 29 Jul | 12:00 | Bahrain | 3-2 | Kuwait | 21-25 | 25-22 | 22-25 | 25-23 | 15-13 | 108–0 | |
| 29 Jul | 20:00 | Iraq | 3-1 | Lebanon | 25-21 | 25-16 | 23-25 | 28-26 | | 101–0 | |

== Final round ==
=== Classification 5–12 places ===
==== Eleventh place match ====
| Date | Time | | Score | | Set 1 | Set 2 | Set 3 | Set 4 | Set 5 | Total | Report |
|---|---|---|---|---|---|---|---|---|---|---|---|
| 31 Jul | 10:00 | Syria | 2–3 | Lebanon | 22-25 | 25-22 | 18-25 | 25-17 | 12-15 | 102–0 | |

==== Ninth place match ====
| Date | Time | | Score | | Set 1 | Set 2 | Set 3 | Set 4 | Set 5 | Total | Report |
|---|---|---|---|---|---|---|---|---|---|---|---|
| 31 Jul | 15:00 | United Arab Emirates | 0–3 | Qatar | 14-25 | 19-25 | 17-25 | | | 50–0 | |

==== Seventh place match ====
| Date | Time | | Score | | Set 1 | Set 2 | Set 3 | Set 4 | Set 5 | Total | Report |
|---|---|---|---|---|---|---|---|---|---|---|---|
| 01 Aug | 10:00 | Bahrain | 2–3 | Algeria | 23-25 | 25-20 | 16-25 | 25-23 | 13-15 | 102–0 | |

==== Fifth place match ====
| Date | Time | | Score | | Set 1 | Set 2 | Set 3 | Set 4 | Set 5 | Total | Report |
|---|---|---|---|---|---|---|---|---|---|---|---|
| 01 Aug | 12:00 | Kuwait | 2–3 | Yemen | 25-17 | 21-25 | 25-23 | 23-25 | 7-15 | 101–0 | |

=== Championship bracket ===
Semifinals
31 July – Beirut
Tunisia | 3
Saudi Arabia | 0
31 July – Beirut
Egypt | 3
Iraq | 0

Final
1 August – Beirut
Egypt | 0
Tunisia | 3
Third place
1 August – Beirut
Iraq | 2
Saudi Arabia | 3

==== Semifinals ====
| Date | Time | | Score | | Set 1 | Set 2 | Set 3 | Set 4 | Set 5 | Total | Report |
|---|---|---|---|---|---|---|---|---|---|---|---|
| 31 Jul | 17:00 | Tunisia | 3–0 | Saudi Arabia | 25-21 | 25-18 | 25-23 | | | 75–0 | |
| 31 Jul | 19:00 | Egypt | 3–0 | Iraq | 25–21 | 26–24 | 28–26 | | | 79–71 | |

==== Bronze medal match ====
| Date | Time | | Score | | Set 1 | Set 2 | Set 3 | Set 4 | Set 5 | Total | Report |
|---|---|---|---|---|---|---|---|---|---|---|---|
| 01 Aug | 15:00 | Iraq | 2–3 | Saudi Arabia | 23-25 | 25-16 | 14-25 | 27-25 | 13-15 | 102–0 | |

==== Final ====
| Date | Time | | Score | | Set 1 | Set 2 | Set 3 | Set 4 | Set 5 | Total | Report |
|---|---|---|---|---|---|---|---|---|---|---|---|
| 01 Aug | 18:00 | Egypt | 0–3 | Tunisia | 17–25 | 19–25 | 18–25 | | | 54–75 | |

== Final standing ==
| Rank | Team |
|---|---|
| 1st place, gold medalist(s) | Tunisia |
| 2nd place, silver medalist(s) | Egypt |
| 3rd place, bronze medalist(s) | Saudi Arabia |
| 4 | Iraq |
| 5 | Yemen |
| 6 | Kuwait |
| 7 | Algeria |
| 8 | Bahrain |
| 9 | Qatar |
| 10 | United Arab Emirates |
| 11 | Lebanon |
| 12 | Syria |

2009 Arab Youth champions

Tunisia
Third title

Team Roster
Omar Agrebi, Amin Ben Bey, Mohamed Ayech, Saddem Hmissi, Mohamed Arbi Ben Abdallah, Khaled Ben Slimene, Houssem Eddine Zoghlami, Mohamed Ali Ben Othmen Miladi, Oussama Krifa, Racem Siala, Mohamed Ali Hchaichi, Khalil Bouazizi
Head Coach: Lotfi Ben Slimane

== Awards ==
- MVP: (Saudi Arabia) Bandar Jemaan Bin Saad
- Best spiker: (Egypt) Ahmed Abderrazak Abdelmoez
- Best blocker: (Egypt) Mohammed Ali Mahdi
- Best server: (Iraq) Mortadha Zoheir Mohammed
- Best setter: (Egypt) Mohammed Fathi Essayed
- Best receiver: (Tunisia) Mohammed Ali Ben Othmen
- Best libero: (Tunisia) Saddem Hmissi
