= Afro-Arab Volleyball Friendship Cup =

Volleyball competition held once in 1981

- Current season, competition or edition: 1981 Afro-Arab Volleyball Friendship Cup
- Sport: Volleyball
- Founded: 1981
- First season: 1981
- Most recent champion: Tunisia (1981)
- Most titles: Tunisia (1 title)

The Afro-Arab Volleyball Friendship Cup (Arabic: بطولة الصداقة العربية الأفريقية للكرة الطائرة) is a volleyball competition which was held between Arab and African countries, and was organized by the Arab Volleyball Association. It started in 1981, and was discontinued after this edition.

== Results ==
Year	Host	Final			Third place match		
Year	Host	Champion	Score	Runner-up	Third place	Score	Fourth place
1981; Details	Kuwait	Tunisia	–	Kuwait	Saudi Arabia	–	
