= 1981 Afro-Arab Volleyball Friendship Cup =

Tournament details
- Host country: Kuwait
- Dates: October 15–25
- Teams: 10
- Venue: 1 (in 1 host city)

Final positions
- Champions: Tunisia (1st title)

The 1981 Afro-Arab Volleyball Friendship Cup was the first edition of the Afro-Arab Volleyball Friendship Cup. It was held in Kuwait City, Kuwait from 15 October to 25 October 1981.

== Teams ==
- Syria
- Iraq
- Bahrain
- Saudi Arabia
- Tunisia
- Libya
- Nigeria
- Ivory Coast
- Senegal
- Kuwait

== Final ranking ==
Rank	Team
1st place, gold medalist(s)	Tunisia
2nd place, silver medalist(s)	Kuwait
3rd place, bronze medalist(s)	Saudi Arabia
