= Arab Volleyball Challenge Cup =

- Most recent season or competition: 2025 Arab Volleyball Challenge Cup
- Sport: Volleyball
- Founded: 2025; 1 year ago
- First season: 2025
- No. of teams: 6 (2025)
- Continent: AVA (Arab World)
- Most recent champion: Tunisia (1st title)
- Most titles: Tunisia (1 titles)

The Arab Volleyball Challenge Cup is a volleyball tournament organized by the Arab Volleyball Association. The first edition was held in 2025.

== History ==
The inaugural edition was held in Amman, Jordan from 28 November to 5 December 2025, with the participation of six national teams: Bahrain, Egypt, Jordan, Kuwait, Palestine, and Tunisia. Tunisia won the championship after topping the standings and achieving victory in all five matches without losing a single set. Tunisian Khaled Ben Slimene won the award for best player in the tournament.

== Results ==
Year	Host	Champions	Second	Third	Fourth	Teams
2025	Amman, Jordan	Tunisia	Egypt	Kuwait	Jordan	6

=== Medal table ===
Rank	Nation	Gold	Silver	Bronze	Total
1	Tunisia	1	0	0	1
2	Egypt	0	1	0	1
3	Kuwait	0	0	1	1
Totals (3 entries)		1	1	1	3

== See also ==
- Arab Volleyball Championship
