= Amir Hossein Toukhteh =

Iranian volleyball player (born 2001)

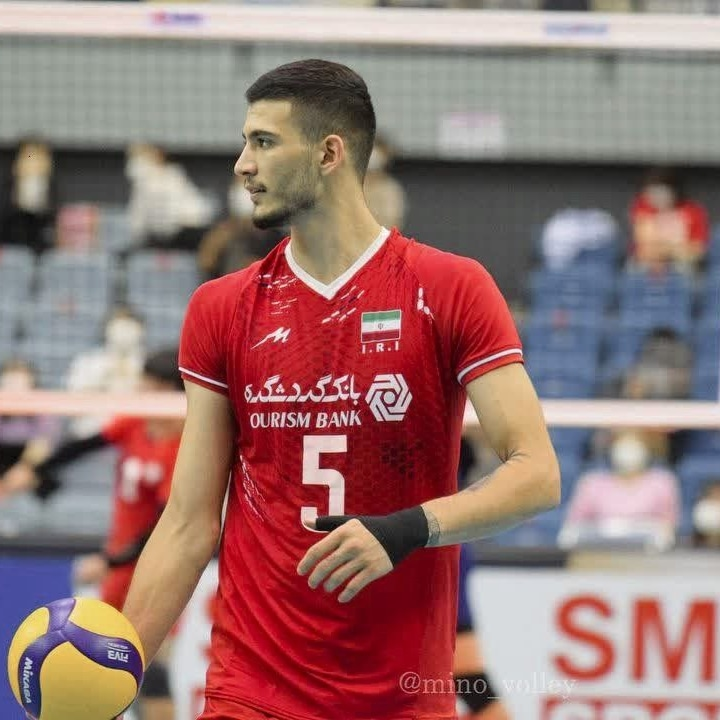

Personal information
- Full name: Amir Hossein Toukhteh
- Born: April 9, 2001 (age 25); Urmia, Iran
- Height: 2.04 m (6 ft 8 in)
- Weight: 87 kg (192 lb)
- Spike: 3.73 m (147 in)
- Block: 3.54 m (139 in)

Volleyball information
- Position: Middle blocker
- Current club: (Iran) Haraz Amol

Career
Years	Teams
2018–2020; 2020–2021; 2021–2022; 2022–	(Iran) Shams Tehran (Iran) Saipa Tehran (Slovenia) ACH Volley Ljubljana (Serbia) Radnički DOO (Iran) Haraz Amol

National team
2017–2019; 2018–2021; 2018–	Iran U19; Iran U21; Iran
Honours
Representing Iran
Men's volleyball
Asian Games
Gold medal – first place	2018 Jakarta–Palembang	Team

Amir Hossein Toukhteh (Persian: امیرحسین توخته, born April 9, 2001, in Urmia) is an Iranian volleyball player who plays as a middle blocker for the Iranian national team.

Toukhteh in 2018 year invited to Iran senior national team by Igor Kolaković and made his debut match against Brazil in the 2018 Nations League.

== Honours ==
=== National team ===
- Asian Games
  - Gold medal (1): 2018
- U21 World Championship
  - Gold medal (1): 2019
- Asian U20 Championship
  - Gold medal (1): 2018
- U19 World Championship
  - Gold medal (1): 2017

=== Individual ===
- Best Middle Blocker: 2017 U19 World Championship
