= 2007 Arab Youth Volleyball Championship =

Tournament details
- Host country: Syria
- Dates: August 16 - August 24
- Teams: 11
- Venue: 1 (in 1 host city)

Final positions
- Champions: Yemen (1st title)

Tournament awards
- MVP: (Tunisia) Hamza Nagga

The 2007 Arab Youth Volleyball Championship was held in Latakia, Syria from the period of 16 August to 24 August 2007.

== Teams ==
- Algeria
- Bahrain
- Lebanon
- Iraq
- Kuwait
- Qatar
- Saudi Arabia
- Syria
- Tunisia (B Team)
- United Arab Emirates
- Yemen

== Pools composition ==
Pool A	Pool B
Qatar (Defending Champion); Syria (Host); Bahrain; Iraq; Yemen; United Arab Emirates	Saudi Arabia; Tunisia; Lebanon; Algeria; Kuwait

=== Pool A ===
Pos	Team	Pld	W	L	Pts	SW	SL	SR	SPW	SPL	SPR	Qualification
1	Yemen	5	5	0	10	15	2	7.500	0	0	—	Semifinals
2	Bahrain	5	4	1	9	12	6	2.000	423	352	1.202	Semifinals
3	Syria	5	3	2	8	10	11	0.909	0	0	—	
4	United Arab Emirates	5	1	4	6	9	13	0.692	0	0	—	
5	Iraq	5	1	4	6	6	12	0.500	0	0	—	
6	Qatar	5	1	4	6	6	14	0.429	0	0	—	

Date	Time		Score		Set 1	Set 2	Set 3	Set 4	Set 5	Total	Report
16 Aug	19:00	Syria	3–2	Iraq	23-25	25-20	20-25	25-21	16-14	109–0	
17 Aug	15:00	Bahrain	3–1	Qatar	25-14	25-19	16-25	25-16		91–0	
17 Aug	17:00	United Arab Emirates	2–3	Yemen	25-18	19-25	15-25	25-22	15-17	99–0	
18 Aug	12:00	Iraq	0–3	Yemen	22-25	15-25	19-25			56–0	
18 Aug	15:00	United Arab Emirates	2–3	Qatar							
18 Aug	19:00	Syria	1–3	Bahrain	22-25	25-22	21-25	18-25		86–0	
19 Aug	10:00	Yemen	3–0	Qatar							
19 Aug	12:00	Iraq	0–3	Bahrain	14-25	11-25	16-25			41–0	
19 Aug	19:00	Syria	3-1	United Arab Emirates							
20 Aug	10:00	Bahrain	0–3	Yemen	24-26	16-25	21-25			61–0	
20 Aug	17:00	Iraq	1-3	United Arab Emirates	25-27	23-25		10-25		58–0	
20 Aug	19:00	Qatar	2–3	Syria	18-25	20-25	25-19	25-21	9-15	97–0	
21 Aug	10:00	Iraq	3–0	Qatar							
21 Aug	12:00	Bahrain	3-1	United Arab Emirates	25-19	25-16	24-26	25-14		99–0	
21 Aug	19:00	Yemen	3-0	Syria	25-16	25-22	25-20			75–0	

=== Pool B ===
Pos	Team	Pld	W	L	Pts	SW	SL	SR	SPW	SPL	SPR	Qualification
1	Tunisia	5	5	0	10	12	4	3.000	0	0	—	Semifinals
2	Kuwait	5	4	1	9	11	4	2.750	346	319	1.085	Semifinals
3	Algeria	0	0	0	0	0	0	—	0	0	—	
4	Saudi Arabia	4	1	3	5	6	10	0.600	0	0	—	
5	Lebanon	0	0	0	0	0	0	—	0	0	—	

Date	Time		Score		Set 1	Set 2	Set 3	Set 4	Set 5	Total	Report
17 Aug	10:00	Kuwait	3–1	Saudi Arabia	25-17	30-28	17-25	25-23		97–0	
17 Aug	19:00	Tunisia	3–1	Lebanon							
18 Aug	10:00	Algeria	0–3	Kuwait	21-25	20-25	23-25			64–0	
18 Aug	17:00	Lebanon	1–3	Saudi Arabia	21-25	21-25	25-22	17-25		84–0	
19 Aug	15:00	Tunisia	3–2	Kuwait	20-25	25-17	23-25	25-17	15-13	108–0	
19 Aug	17:00	Algeria	3–1	Saudi Arabia							
20 Aug	12:00	Algeria	–	Lebanon							
20 Aug	15:00	Saudi Arabia	1–3	Tunisia	17-25	25-23	17-25	15-25		74–0	
21 Aug	15:00	Tunisia	3–0	Algeria							
21 Aug	17:00	Lebanon	0-3	Kuwait	12-25	17-25	25-27			54–0	

== Final round ==
=== Classification 5–10 places ===
==== Ninth place match ====
Date	Time		Score		Set 1	Set 2	Set 3	Set 4	Set 5	Total	Report
23 Aug		Lebanon	1–3	Iraq							

==== Seventh place match ====
Date	Time		Score		Set 1	Set 2	Set 3	Set 4	Set 5	Total	Report
23 Aug	09:00	United Arab Emirates	3–1	Saudi Arabia							

==== Fifth place match ====
Date	Time		Score		Set 1	Set 2	Set 3	Set 4	Set 5	Total	Report
23 Aug		Algeria	–	Syria							

=== Championship bracket ===
Semifinals
August 23 – Latakia
Tunisia	1
Bahrain	3
August 23 – Latakia
Yemen	3
Kuwait	2

Final
August 24 – Latakia
Bahrain	0
Yemen	3
Third place
August 24 – Latakia
Tunisia	1
Kuwait	3

==== Semifinals ====
Date	Time		Score		Set 1	Set 2	Set 3	Set 4	Set 5	Total	Report
23 Aug	17:00	Yemen	3–2	Kuwait	24-26	25-27	25-20	28-26	15-13	117–0	
23 Aug	19:00	Tunisia	1–3	Bahrain	13-25	25-27	25-17	25-27		88–0	

==== Bronze medal match ====
Date	Time		Score		Set 1	Set 2	Set 3	Set 4	Set 5	Total	Report
24 Aug		Tunisia	2–3	Kuwait	18-25	25-12	20-25	25-20	17-19	105–0	

==== Final ====
Date	Time		Score		Set 1	Set 2	Set 3	Set 4	Set 5	Total	Report
24 Aug		Bahrain	0–3	Yemen	15–25	23–25	20–25			58–75	

== Final standing ==
Rank	Team
1st place, gold medalist(s)	Yemen
2nd place, silver medalist(s)	Bahrain
3rd place, bronze medalist(s)	Kuwait
4	Tunisia
5	
6	
7	United Arab Emirates
8	Saudi Arabia
9	Iraq
10	Lebanon
11	Qatar

== Awards ==
- MVP: (Tunisia) Hamza Nagga
- Best spiker: (Bahrain) Ali Marhoun
- Best blocker: (Kuwait) Sultan Ahmed
- Best server: (Bahrain) Ali Sirafi
- Best setter: (Yemen) Soleyman Abdelfateh
- Best receiver: (Kuwait) Mosleh Alomar
- Best digger: (Tunisia) Safouen Mohammed Ali
- Best Looking: (Syria) Roni Marwan Aloe
