= Libyan Volleyball Federation =

- Jurisdiction: Libya
- Abbreviation: LVBF
- Founded: 1964
- Affiliation: FIVB
- Affiliation date: 1964
- Headquarters: Tripoli
- Location: Libya
- (Libya)

The Libyan Volleyball Federation (Arabic: الاتحاد الليبي للكرة الطائرة) (LVBF) is the governing body of volleyball in Libya. It was founded in 1964, affiliated to CAVB in 1968 and to AVA in 1975.
