= 2011 Arab Youth Volleyball Championship =

Tournament details
- Host country: Egypt
- Dates: July 20–27
- Teams: 9
- Venue: 1 (in 1 host city)

Final positions
- Champions: Bahrain (th title)

Tournament awards
- MVP: (Tunisia) Oussama Mrika

The 2011 Arab Youth Volleyball Championship was held in Hurghada, Egypt from 20 July to 27 July 2011.

== Pools composition ==
| Pool A | Pool B |
|---|---|
| Egypt (Host); Bahrain; Kuwait; Saudi Arabia | Tunisia (Defending Champion); Algeria; Syria; Palestine; Qatar |

=== Pool A ===
| Pos | Team | Pld | W | L | Pts | SW | SL | SR | SPW | SPL | SPR | Qualification |
|---|---|---|---|---|---|---|---|---|---|---|---|---|
| 1 | Bahrain | 3 | 3 | 0 | 6 | 9 | 0 | MAX | 226 | 169 | 1.337 | Semifinals |
| 2 | Egypt | 3 | 2 | 1 | 5 | 6 | 3 | 2.000 | 213 | 198 | 1.076 | Semifinals |
| 3 | Saudi Arabia | 3 | 1 | 2 | 4 | 3 | 8 | 0.375 | 221 | 251 | 0.880 | |
| 4 | Kuwait | 3 | 0 | 3 | 3 | 2 | 9 | 0.222 | 203 | 245 | 0.829 | |

| Date | Time | | Score | | Set 1 | Set 2 | Set 3 | Set 4 | Set 5 | Total | Report |
|---|---|---|---|---|---|---|---|---|---|---|---|
| 20 Jul | | Bahrain | 3–0 | Kuwait | 25-16 | 25-16 | 25-16 | | | 75–0 | |
| 20 Jul | | Egypt | 3–0 | Saudi Arabia | 25-18 | 28-26 | 25-21 | | | 78–0 | |
| 21 Jul | | Kuwait | 2–3 | Saudi Arabia | 22-25 | 25-10 | 15-25 | 25-20 | 11-15 | 98–0 | |
| 22 Jul | | Egypt | 0–3 | Bahrain | 23-25 | 24-26 | 13-25 | | | 60–0 | |
| 23 Jul | | Saudi Arabia | 0–3 | Bahrain | 21-25 | 21-25 | 19-25 | | | 61–0 | |
| 24 Jul | | Egypt | 3-0 | Kuwait | 25-21 | 25-22 | 25-14 | | | 75–0 | |

=== Pool B ===
| Pos | Team | Pld | W | L | Pts | SW | SL | SR | SPW | SPL | SPR | Qualification |
|---|---|---|---|---|---|---|---|---|---|---|---|---|
| 1 | Tunisia | 4 | 4 | 0 | 8 | 12 | 2 | 6.000 | 334 | 254 | 1.315 | Semifinals |
| 2 | Algeria | 4 | 3 | 1 | 7 | 9 | 4 | 2.250 | 0 | 0 | — | Semifinals |
| 3 | Qatar | 4 | 2 | 2 | 6 | 8 | 7 | 1.143 | 322 | 313 | 1.029 | |
| 4 | Palestine | 4 | 1 | 3 | 5 | 3 | 9 | 0.333 | 0 | 0 | — | |
| 5 | Syria | 4 | 0 | 4 | 4 | 1 | 12 | 0.083 | 0 | 0 | — | |

| Date | Time | | Score | | Set 1 | Set 2 | Set 3 | Set 4 | Set 5 | Total | Report |
|---|---|---|---|---|---|---|---|---|---|---|---|
| 20 Jul | | Tunisia | 3–0 | Syria | 25–23 | 25–19 | 25–19 | | | 75–61 | |
| 20 Jul | | Qatar | 0–3 | Algeria | 20-25 | 19-25 | 18-25 | | | 57–0 | |
| 21 Jul | | Syria | 0–3 | Algeria | | | | | | | |
| 21 Jul | | Tunisia | 3–0 | Palestine | 25-13 | 25-14 | 25-14 | | | 75–0 | |
| 22 Jul | | Algeria | 0–3 | Tunisia | 20-25 | 21-25 | 17-25 | | | 58–0 | |
| 22 Jul | | Qatar | 3–0 | Palestine | 25-14 | 25-18 | 25-16 | | | 75–0 | |
| 23 Jul | | Algeria | 3–0 | Palestine | | | | | | | |
| 23 Jul | | Qatar | 3–1 | Syria | 25-16 | 21-25 | 25-21 | 25-19 | | 96–0 | |
| 24 Jul | | Palestine | 3–0 | Syria | | | | | | | |
| 24 Jul | | Tunisia | 3–2 | Qatar | 25-16 | 24-26 | 20-25 | 25-15 | 15-12 | 109–0 | |

== Final round ==
=== Classification 5–8 places ===
==== Seventh place match ====
| Date | Time | | Score | | Set 1 | Set 2 | Set 3 | Set 4 | Set 5 | Total | Report |
|---|---|---|---|---|---|---|---|---|---|---|---|
| 26 Jul | 14:00 | Palestine | 1–3 | Kuwait | | | | | | | |

==== Fifth place match ====
| Date | Time | | Score | | Set 1 | Set 2 | Set 3 | Set 4 | Set 5 | Total | Report |
|---|---|---|---|---|---|---|---|---|---|---|---|
| 26 Jul | 16:00 | Qatar | 1–3 | Saudi Arabia | 25-14 | 22-25 | 20-25 | 20-25 | | 87–0 | |

=== Championship bracket ===
Semifinals
July 26 – Hurghada
Tunisia | 3
Egypt | 1
July 26 – Hurghada
Bahrain | 3
Algeria | 1

Final
July 27 – Hurghada
Tunisia | 0
Bahrain | 3
Third place
July 27 – Hurghada
Algeria | 0
Egypt | 3

==== Semifinals ====
| Date | Time | | Score | | Set 1 | Set 2 | Set 3 | Set 4 | Set 5 | Total | Report |
|---|---|---|---|---|---|---|---|---|---|---|---|
| 26 Jul | 18:00 | Bahrain | 3–1 | Algeria | 17-25 | 25-18 | 25-21 | 25-18 | | 92–0 | |
| 26 Jul | 20:00 | Tunisia | 3–1 | Egypt | 23–25 | 29–27 | 25–16 | 25–21 | | 102–89 | |

==== Bronze medal match ====
| Date | Time | | Score | | Set 1 | Set 2 | Set 3 | Set 4 | Set 5 | Total | Report |
|---|---|---|---|---|---|---|---|---|---|---|---|
| 27 Jul | 18:00 | Algeria | 0–3 | Egypt | 22-25 | 21-25 | 16-25 | | | 59–0 | |

==== Final ====
| Date | Time | | Score | | Set 1 | Set 2 | Set 3 | Set 4 | Set 5 | Total | Report |
|---|---|---|---|---|---|---|---|---|---|---|---|
| 27 Jul | 20:00 | Tunisia | 0–3 | Bahrain | 22–25 | 22–25 | 18–25 | | | 62–75 | |

== Final standing ==
| Rank | Team |
|---|---|
| 1st place, gold medalist(s) | Bahrain |
| 2nd place, silver medalist(s) | Tunisia |
| 3rd place, bronze medalist(s) | Egypt |
| 4 | Algeria |
| 5 | Saudi Arabia |
| 6 | Qatar |
| 7 | Kuwait |
| 8 | Palestine |
| 9 | Syria |

== Awards ==
- MVP: (Tunisia) Oussama Mrika
- Best spiker: (Egypt) Mohammed Adel
- Best blocker: (Bahrain) Rashid Ahmed Al Assily
- Best server: (Bahrain) Mahmoud Al Afiya
- Best setter: (Tunisia) Khaled Ben Slimene
- Best receiver: (Bahrain) Ali Hassan Sultan
- Best libero: (Egypt) Mohammed Redha
