= 2017 FIVB Volleyball Boys' U19 World Championship =

2017 Boys' U19 World Championship
بطولة العالم للكرة الطائرة رجال تحت 19 عاما 2017 البحرين

Tournament details
- Host country: Bahrain
- City: Riffa
- Dates: 18–27 August
- Teams: 20 (from 5 confederations)
- Venue: 2 (in 1 host city)

Final positions
- Champions: Iran (2nd title)
- Runners-up: Russia
- Third place: Japan
- Fourth place: South Korea

Tournament awards
- MVP: (Iran) Amirhossein Esfandiar
- Best Setter: (Japan) Shunsuke Nakamura
- Best OH: (Iran) Amirhossein Esfandiar (Russia) Pavel Tetyukhin
- Best MB: (Russia) Artem Melnikov (Iran) Amir Hossein Toukhteh
- Best OPP: (South Korea) Im Dong-hyeok
- Best Libero: (Japan) Kenta Ichikawa

The 2017 FIVB Volleyball Boys' U19 World Championship was the fifteenth edition of the FIVB Volleyball Boys' U19 World Championship, contested by the men's national teams under the age of 19 of the members of the FIVB, the sport's global governing body. The tournament was held in Riffa, Bahrain from 18 to 27 August 2017. 20 teams from the 5 confederations competed in the tournament.

Players must be born on or after 1 January 1999.

Iran won its second title in the competition, defeating Russia in the final. Japan defeated South Korea for the bronze medal. Amirhossein Esfandiar from Iran was elected the MVP.

== Qualification ==
The FIVB Sports Events Council revealed a proposal to streamline the number of teams participating in the Age Group World Championships.

Means of qualification		Date	Venue	Vacancies	Qualifier
Host country		2 February 2016	(Switzerland) Lausanne	1	Bahrain
2016 NORCECA Championship		24–29 June 2016	(Cuba) Havana	2	Cuba
2016 NORCECA Championship		24–29 June 2016	(Cuba) Havana	2	United States
2016 African Championship		8–10 September 2016	(Tunisia) Kélibia	2	Tunisia
2016 African Championship		8–10 September 2016	(Tunisia) Kélibia	2	Egypt
2016 South American Championship		5–9 October 2016	(Peru) Lima	2	Argentina
2016 South American Championship		5–9 October 2016	(Peru) Lima	2	Brazil
2017 Pan-American Cup	for CSV	20–25 March 2017	(Mexico) Monterrey	1	Chile
2017 Pan-American Cup	for NORCECA	20–25 March 2017	(Mexico) Monterrey	2	Mexico
2017 Pan-American Cup	for NORCECA	20–25 March 2017	(Mexico) Monterrey	2	Puerto Rico
2017 Asian Championship		28 March – 5 April 2017	(Myanmar) Naypyidaw	4	Japan
2017 Asian Championship		28 March – 5 April 2017	(Myanmar) Naypyidaw	4	South Korea
2017 Asian Championship		28 March – 5 April 2017	(Myanmar) Naypyidaw	4	China
2017 Asian Championship		28 March – 5 April 2017	(Myanmar) Naypyidaw	4	Iran
2017 European Championship		22–30 April 2017	(Hungary) Győr & (Slovakia) Púchov	6	Czech Republic
2017 European Championship		22–30 April 2017	(Hungary) Győr & (Slovakia) Púchov	6	Italy
2017 European Championship		22–30 April 2017	(Hungary) Győr & (Slovakia) Púchov	6	Turkey
2017 European Championship		22–30 April 2017	(Hungary) Győr & (Slovakia) Púchov	6	Russia
2017 European Championship		22–30 April 2017	(Hungary) Győr & (Slovakia) Púchov	6	Poland
2017 European Championship		22–30 April 2017	(Hungary) Győr & (Slovakia) Púchov	6	France
Total				20	

== Pools composition ==
Teams were seeded in the first two positions of each pool following the serpentine system according to their FIVB U19 World Ranking as of January 2017. FIVB reserved the right to seed the hosts as head of pool A regardless of the U19 World Ranking. The twelve remaining teams were drawn in next three rows under the condition that there were not too much country in the same confederation were drawn in the same pool. The draw was held in Manama, Bahrain on 20 May 2017. Rankings are shown in brackets except the hosts who ranked 38th.

Seeded teams		Pot 1	Pot 2	Pot 3
Bahrain (Hosts); Poland (1); Argentina (2); Iran (3)	Italy (4); Russia (5); Brazil (6); United States (7)	Cuba (9); Mexico (12); Chile (18); Puerto Rico (31)	China (8); Japan (11); Egypt (13); South Korea (27)	Turkey (10); Tunisia (15); France (21); Czech Republic (32)

Draw

Pool A	Pool B	Pool C	Pool D
Bahrain	Poland	Argentina	Iran
United States	Brazil	Russia	Italy
Puerto Rico	Cuba	Chile	Mexico
Egypt	Japan	South Korea	China
Tunisia	France	Turkey	Czech Republic

== Venues ==
- Isa Sports City Hall C, Riffa, Bahrain – Pool A, B and Final round
- Isa Sports City Hall B, Riffa, Bahrain – Pool C, D and Final round

== Pool standing procedure ==
1. Number of matches won
2. Match points
3. Sets ratio
4. Points ratio
5. If the tie continues as per the point ratio between two teams, the priority will be given to the team which won the last match between them. When the tie in points ratio is between three or more teams, a new classification of these teams in the terms of points 1, 2 and 3 will be made taking into consideration only the matches in which they were opposed to each other.

Match won 3–0 or 3–1: 3 match points for the winner, 0 match points for the loser
Match won 3–2: 2 match points for the winner, 1 match point for the loser

== Preliminary round ==
- All times are Arabia Standard Time (UTC+03:00).

=== Pool A ===
Pos	Team	Pld	W	L	Pts	SW	SL	SR	SPW	SPL	SPR	Qualification
1	Egypt	4	3	1	9	10	6	1.667	387	381	1.016	Round of 16
2	Bahrain	4	3	1	8	10	7	1.429	397	342	1.161	Round of 16
3	United States	4	3	1	8	10	7	1.429	403	379	1.063	Round of 16
4	Puerto Rico	4	1	3	3	7	11	0.636	370	424	0.873	Round of 16
5	Tunisia	4	0	4	2	6	12	0.500	410	441	0.930	17th–20th places

Date	Time		Score		Set 1	Set 2	Set 3	Set 4	Set 5	Total	Report
18 Aug	17:00	Puerto Rico	3–2	Tunisia	20–25	25–18	30–32	25–22	17–15	117–112	P2 P3
18 Aug	19:00	Bahrain	3–1	Egypt	25–17	25–20	19–25	25–20		94–82	P2 P3
19 Aug	17:00	Egypt	3–1	Puerto Rico	29–27	25–20	23–25	25–17		102–89	P2 P3
19 Aug	19:00	United States	3–1	Bahrain	28–26	25–19	20–25	25–23		98–93	P2 P3
20 Aug	17:00	Puerto Rico	1–3	United States	21–25	18–25	25–23	22–25		86–98	P2 P3
20 Aug	19:00	Tunisia	1–3	Egypt	24–26	25–22	28–30	30–32		107–110	P2 P3
21 Aug	17:00	United States	3–2	Tunisia	28–30	22–25	25–19	26–24	15–9	116–107	P2 P3
21 Aug	19:00	Bahrain	3–2	Puerto Rico	23–25	25–7	25–10	24–26	15–10	112–78	P2 P3
22 Aug	17:00	Egypt	3–1	United States	18–25	25–23	25–22	25–21		93–91	P2 P3
22 Aug	19:00	Tunisia	1–3	Bahrain	19–25	18–25	25–23	22–25		84–98	P2 P3

=== Pool B ===
Pos	Team	Pld	W	L	Pts	SW	SL	SR	SPW	SPL	SPR	Qualification
1	Japan	4	4	0	11	12	3	4.000	361	310	1.165	Round of 16
2	France	4	3	1	9	11	6	1.833	407	374	1.088	Round of 16
3	Brazil	4	2	2	7	8	8	1.000	354	349	1.014	Round of 16
4	Cuba	4	1	3	2	4	11	0.364	299	336	0.890	Round of 16
5	Poland	4	0	4	1	5	12	0.417	361	413	0.874	17th–20th places

Date	Time		Score		Set 1	Set 2	Set 3	Set 4	Set 5	Total	Report
18 Aug	13:00	Brazil	2–3	France	25–23	25–20	17–25	17–25	15–17	99–110	P2 P3
18 Aug	15:00	Cuba	0–3	Japan	21–25	18–25	12–25			51–75	P2 P3
19 Aug	13:00	France	3–0	Cuba	25–19	25–23	25–14			75–56	P2 P3
19 Aug	15:00	Poland	1–3	Brazil	25–22	13–25	18–25	22–25		78–97	P2 P3
20 Aug	13:00	Cuba	3–2	Poland	21–25	25–22	25–9	21–25	15–10	107–91	P2 P3
20 Aug	15:00	Japan	3–2	France	24–26	27–25	23–25	25–20	15–13	114–109	P2 P3
21 Aug	13:00	Poland	1–3	Japan	19–25	23–25	25–21	20–25		87–96	P2 P3
21 Aug	15:00	Brazil	3–1	Cuba	25–19	20–25	25–22	25–19		95–85	P2 P3
22 Aug	13:00	Japan	3–0	Brazil	25–21	26–24	25–18			76–63	P2 P3
22 Aug	15:00	France	3–1	Poland	23–25	25–22	25–20	40–38		113–105	P2 P3

=== Pool C ===
Pos	Team	Pld	W	L	Pts	SW	SL	SR	SPW	SPL	SPR	Qualification
1	Russia	4	3	1	9	10	4	2.500	332	264	1.258	Round of 16
2	Argentina	4	3	1	9	11	6	1.833	276	252	1.095	Round of 16
3	South Korea	4	2	2	7	9	7	1.286	370	350	1.057	Round of 16
4	Turkey	4	2	2	5	7	8	0.875	211	230	0.917	Round of 16
5	Chile	4	0	4	0	0	12	0.000	207	300	0.690	17th–20th places

Date	Time		Score		Set 1	Set 2	Set 3	Set 4	Set 5	Total	Report
18 Aug	13:00	Russia	3–0	Turkey	25–16	25–16	25–12			75–44	P2 P3
18 Aug	15:00	Chile	0–3	South Korea	12–25	21–25	21–25			54–75	P2 P3
19 Aug	13:00	Chile	0–3	Turkey	14–25	19–25	19–25			52–75	P2 P3
19 Aug	15:00	Argentina	3–1	Russia	20–25	25–13	25–23	26–24		96–85	P2 P3
20 Aug	13:00	Argentina	3–0	Chile	25–23	25–13	25–22			75–58	P2 P3
20 Aug	15:00	South Korea	3–1	Turkey	26–28	25–20	25–21	27–25		103–94	P2 P3
21 Aug	13:00	Argentina	3–2	South Korea	17–25	20–25	25–22	25–21	18–16	105–109	P2 P3
21 Aug	15:00	Russia	3–0	Chile	25–17	25–11	25–15			75–43	P2 P3
22 Aug	13:00	Russia	3–1	South Korea	25–22	25–16	22–25	25–20		97–83	P2 P3
22 Aug	15:00	Argentina	2–3	Turkey	26–28	22–25	25–21	25–19	11–15	109–108	P2 P3

=== Pool D ===
Pos	Team	Pld	W	L	Pts	SW	SL	SR	SPW	SPL	SPR	Qualification
1	Iran	4	4	0	11	12	2	6.000	336	261	1.287	Round of 16
2	Italy	4	3	1	10	11	5	2.200	366	337	1.086	Round of 16
3	Czech Republic	4	2	2	6	7	7	1.000	321	316	1.016	Round of 16
4	China	4	1	3	3	5	9	0.556	303	322	0.941	Round of 16
5	Mexico	4	0	4	0	0	12	0.000	214	303	0.706	17th–20th places

Date	Time		Score		Set 1	Set 2	Set 3	Set 4	Set 5	Total	Report
18 Aug	17:00	Italy	3–1	Czech Republic	25–19	25–21	19–25	30–28		99–93	P2 P3
18 Aug	19:00	Mexico	0–3	China	19–25	17–25	19–25			55–75	P2 P3
19 Aug	17:00	Mexico	0–3	Czech Republic	26–28	16–25	17–25			59–78	P2 P3
19 Aug	19:00	Iran	3–2	Italy	25–16	23–25	23–25	25–19	15–12	111–97	P2 P3
20 Aug	17:00	Iran	3–0	Mexico	25–19	25–12	25–18			75–49	P2 P3
20 Aug	19:00	China	1–3	Czech Republic	25–22	16–25	20–25	22–25		83–97	P2 P3
21 Aug	17:00	Iran	3–0	China	25–23	25–18	25–21			75–62	P2 P3
21 Aug	19:00	Italy	3–0	Mexico	25–15	25–19	25–17			75–51	P2 P3
22 Aug	17:00	Italy	3–1	China	25–22	25–13	20–25	25–23		95–83	P2 P3
22 Aug	19:00	Iran	3–0	Czech Republic	25–22	25–12	25–19			75–53	P2 P3

== Final round ==
- All times are Arabia Standard Time (UTC+03:00).

=== 17th–20th places ===
Pos	Team	Pld	W	L	Pts	SW	SL	SR	SPW	SPL	SPR
1	Poland	3	2	1	6	7	3	2.333	244	201	1.214
2	Mexico	3	2	1	4	6	7	0.857	272	279	0.975
3	Chile	3	1	2	4	6	7	0.857	264	287	0.920
4	Tunisia	3	1	2	4	5	7	0.714	240	253	0.949

Date	Time	Venue		Score		Set 1	Set 2	Set 3	Set 4	Set 5	Total	Report
24 Aug	11:00	ISC	Tunisia	2–3	Mexico	18–25	21–25	25–18	25–22	11–15	100–105	P2 P3
24 Aug	11:00	ISB	Poland	1–3	Chile	26–28	25–13	21–25	18–25		90–91	P2 P3
25 Aug	11:00	ISC	Chile	2–3	Mexico	25–19	21–25	25–17	22–25	7–15	100–101	P2 P3
25 Aug	11:00	ISB	Tunisia	0–3	Poland	15–25	16–25	13–25			44–75	P2 P3
26 Aug	11:00	ISC	Poland	3–0	Mexico	25–16	29–27	25–23			79–66	P2 P3
26 Aug	11:00	ISB	Tunisia	3–1	Chile	25–16	21–25	25–21	25–11		96–73	P2 P3

=== Final sixteen ===
Round of 16
24 August
Japan	3
Puerto Rico	0
24 August
Argentina	1
Czech Republic	3
24 August
France	3
United States	0
24 August
Russia	3
China	1
24 August
Iran	3
Turkey	0
24 August
Brazil	3
Bahrain	0
24 August
Italy	0
South Korea	3
24 August
Egypt	3
Cuba	2

Quarterfinals
25 August
Japan	3
Czech Republic	0
25 August
France	2
Russia	3
25 August
Iran	3
Brazil	0
25 August
South Korea	3
Egypt	1

Semifinals
26 August
Japan	0
Russia	3
26 August
Iran	3
South Korea	0

Final
27 August
Russia	1
Iran	3
3rd place match
27 August
Japan	3
South Korea	0

5th–8th semifinals
26 August
Czech Republic	1
France	3
26 August
Brazil	0
Egypt	3

5th place match
27 August
France	3
Egypt	0
7th place match
27 August
Czech Republic	3
Brazil	2

9th–16th quarterfinals
25 August
Puerto Rico	1
Argentina	3
25 August
United States	1
China	3
25 August
Turkey	3
Bahrain	0
25 August
Italy	3
Cuba	0

9th–12th semifinals
26 August
Argentina	2
China	3
26 August
Turkey	2
Italy	3

9th place match
27 August
China	0
Italy	3
11th place match
27 August
Argentina	1
Turkey	3

13th–16th semifinals
26 August
Puerto Rico	3
United States	1
26 August
Bahrain	3
Cuba	0

13th place match
27 August
Puerto Rico	0
Bahrain	3
15th place match
27 August
United States	3
Cuba	0

==== Round of 16 ====
Date	Time	Venue		Score		Set 1	Set 2	Set 3	Set 4	Set 5	Total	Report
24 Aug	13:40	ISC	Japan	3–0	Puerto Rico	25–17	25–16	25–21			75–54	P2 P3
24 Aug	13:40	ISB	Argentina	1–3	Czech Republic	22–25	22–25	25–20	21–25		90–95	P2 P3
24 Aug	15:40	ISC	France	3–0	United States	25–21	25–13	25–20			75–54	P2 P3
24 Aug	17:00	ISB	Russia	3–1	China	22–25	25–12	25–16	25–13		97–66	P2 P3
24 Aug	17:40	ISC	Iran	3–0	Turkey	25–18	25–21	25–13			75–52	P2 P3
24 Aug	19:15	ISB	Italy	0–3	South Korea	23–25	22–25	13–25			58–75	P2 P3
24 Aug	19:30	ISC	Brazil	3–0	Bahrain	25–14	25–15	25–18			75–47	P2 P3
24 Aug	21:20	ISB	Egypt	3–2	Cuba	25–19	23–25	18–25	25–22	15–10	106–101	P2 P3

==== 9th–16th quarterfinals ====
Date	Time	Venue		Score		Set 1	Set 2	Set 3	Set 4	Set 5	Total	Report
25 Aug	13:00	ISB	Puerto Rico	1–3	Argentina	24–26	12–25	25–21	17–25		78–97	P2 P3
25 Aug	15:30	ISB	United States	1–3	China	26–24	20–25	27–29	20–25		93–103	P2 P3
25 Aug	18:15	ISB	Turkey	3–0	Bahrain	25–17	25–20	25–23			75–60	P2 P3
25 Aug	20:15	ISB	Italy	3–0	Cuba	25–18	25–20	25–17			75–55	P2 P3

==== Quarterfinals ====
Date	Time	Venue		Score		Set 1	Set 2	Set 3	Set 4	Set 5	Total	Report
25 Aug	13:40	ISC	Japan	3–0	Czech Republic	25–22	25–18	25–22			75–62	P2 P3
25 Aug	15:35	ISC	France	2–3	Russia	27–25	24–26	25–23	19–25	14–16	109–115	P2 P3
25 Aug	18:30	ISC	Iran	3–0	Brazil	25–21	25–20	25–15			75–56	P2 P3
25 Aug	20:30	ISC	South Korea	3–1	Egypt	25–20	20–25	25–20	25–19		95–84	P2 P3

==== 13th–16th semifinals ====
Date	Time	Venue		Score		Set 1	Set 2	Set 3	Set 4	Set 5	Total	Report
26 Aug	13:30	ISB	Puerto Rico	3–1	United States	25–20	21–25	30–28	25–23		101–96	P2 P3
26 Aug	16:20	ISB	Bahrain	3–0	Cuba	25–23	25–16	25–16			75–55	P2 P3

==== 9th–12th semifinals ====
Date	Time	Venue		Score		Set 1	Set 2	Set 3	Set 4	Set 5	Total	Report
26 Aug	18:25	ISB	Argentina	2–3	China	23–25	26–24	22–25	25–23	16–18	112–115	P2 P3
26 Aug	21:35	ISB	Turkey	2–3	Italy	26–28	25–16	21–25	25–20	8–15	105–104	P2 P3

==== 5th–8th semifinals ====
Date	Time	Venue		Score		Set 1	Set 2	Set 3	Set 4	Set 5	Total	Report
26 Aug	13:00	ISC	Czech Republic	1–3	France	25–23	18–25	22–25	21–25		86–98	P2 P3
26 Aug	15:30	ISC	Brazil	0–3	Egypt	31–33	15–25	19–25			65–83	P2 P3

==== Semifinals ====
Date	Time	Venue		Score		Set 1	Set 2	Set 3	Set 4	Set 5	Total	Report
26 Aug	17:50	ISC	Japan	0–3	Russia	17–25	23–25	28–30			68–80	P2 P3
26 Aug	19:50	ISC	Iran	3–0	South Korea	25–23	25–20	25–18			75–61	P2 P3

==== 15th place match ====
Date	Time	Venue		Score		Set 1	Set 2	Set 3	Set 4	Set 5	Total	Report
27 Aug	11:00	ISB	United States	3–0	Cuba	25–20	25–19	26–24			76–63	P2 P3

==== 13th place match ====
Date	Time	Venue		Score		Set 1	Set 2	Set 3	Set 4	Set 5	Total	Report
27 Aug	13:00	ISB	Puerto Rico	0–3	Bahrain	20–25	22–25	23–25			65–75	P2 P3

==== 11th place match ====
Date	Time	Venue		Score		Set 1	Set 2	Set 3	Set 4	Set 5	Total	Report
27 Aug	15:00	ISB	Argentina	1–3	Turkey	25–27	20–25	25–19	18–25		88–96	P2 P3

==== 9th place match ====
Date	Time	Venue		Score		Set 1	Set 2	Set 3	Set 4	Set 5	Total	Report
27 Aug	17:25	ISB	China	0–3	Italy	19–25	16–25	20–25			55–75	P2 P3

==== 7th place match ====
Date	Time	Venue		Score		Set 1	Set 2	Set 3	Set 4	Set 5	Total	Report
27 Aug	11:00	ISC	Czech Republic	3–2	Brazil	25–20	18–25	25–20	20–25	15–9	103–99	P2 P3

==== 5th place match ====
Date	Time	Venue		Score		Set 1	Set 2	Set 3	Set 4	Set 5	Total	Report
27 Aug	13:50	ISC	France	3–0	Egypt	25–20	25–16	26–24			76–60	P2 P3

==== 3rd place match ====
Date	Time	Venue		Score		Set 1	Set 2	Set 3	Set 4	Set 5	Total	Report
27 Aug	15:50	ISC	Japan	3–0	South Korea	25–22	25–22	25–18			75–62	P2 P3

==== Final ====
Date	Time	Venue		Score		Set 1	Set 2	Set 3	Set 4	Set 5	Total	Report
27 Aug	19:00	ISC	Russia	1–3	Iran	20–25	23–25	25–21	20–25		88–96	P2 P3

== Final standing ==
Rank	Team
1st place, gold medalist(s)	Iran
2nd place, silver medalist(s)	Russia
3rd place, bronze medalist(s)	Japan
4	South Korea
5	France
6	Egypt
7	Czech Republic
8	Brazil
9	Italy
10	China
11	Turkey
12	Argentina
13	Bahrain
14	Puerto Rico
15	United States
16	Cuba
17	Poland
18	Mexico
19	Chile
20	Tunisia

2017 Boys' U19 World champions

Iran
2nd title

12–man roster
Mohammad Hossein Rasti, Mehdi Jelveh, Amir Hossein Toukhteh, Amir Mohammad Falahat, Ehsan Daneshdoust, Morteza Sharifi, Mehran Feyz, Amirhossein Esfandiar (c), Hossein Soleiman, Mohammad Reza Hazratpour, Erfan Gholamipour, Porya Yali
Head coach
Mohammad Vakili

== Awards ==
- Most valuable player
  (Iran) Amirhossein Esfandiar
- Best setter
  (Japan) Shunsuke Nakamura
- Best outside spikers
  (Iran) Amirhossein Esfandiar
  (Russia) Pavel Tetyukhin
- Best middle blockers
  (Russia) Artem Melnikov
  (Iran) Amir Hossein Toukhteh
- Best opposite spiker
  (South Korea) Im Dong-hyeok
- Best libero
  (Japan) Kenta Ichikawa

== See also ==
- 2017 FIVB Volleyball Girls' U18 World Championship
