= 2020 African Volleyball Championship U19 =

Tournament details
- Host country: Nigeria
- City: Abuja
- Dates: 4–8 March 2021
- Teams: 4 (from 1 confederation)
- Venue: 1 (in 1 host city)

Final positions
- Champions: Nigeria (1st title)
- Runners-up: Cameroon
- Third place: Gambia
- Fourth place: Morocco

Tournament statistics
- Matches played: 6

The 2020 African Volleyball Championship U19 was held in Abuja, Nigeria from 4 to 8 March 2021. The top two teams of the tournament qualified for the 2021 FIVB Volleyball Boys' U19 World Championship.

Nigeria finished the 4-team round-robin tournament on top of the standing to clinch their first title.

== Qualification ==
9 CAVB under-19 national teams have registered to participate in the 2020 African Championship U19. But, Central African Republic, DR Congo, Egypt, Madagascar and Tunisia later withdrew.

- Nigeria (Hosts)
- Cameroon
- ~~Central African Republic~~
- ~~DR Congo~~
- ~~Egypt~~
- Gambia
- ~~Madagascar~~
- Morocco
- ~~Tunisia~~

== Venue ==
- Abuja Sports Hall, Abuja, Nigeria

== Pool standing procedure ==
1. Number of matches won
2. Match points
3. Sets ratio
4. Points ratio
5. Result of the last match between the tied teams

Match won 3–0 or 3–1: 3 match points for the winner, 0 match points for the loser
Match won 3–2: 2 match points for the winner, 1 match point for the loser

== Round robin ==
Pos	Team	Pld	W	L	Pts	SW	SL	SR	SPW	SPL	SPR
1	Nigeria	3	3	0	8	9	3	3.000	282	232	1.216
2	Cameroon	3	2	1	7	8	3	2.667	246	213	1.155
3	Gambia	3	1	2	2	4	8	0.500	248	275	0.902
4	Morocco	3	0	3	1	2	9	0.222	205	261	0.785

Date		Score		Set 1	Set 2	Set 3	Set 4	Set 5	Total	Report
4 Mar	Nigeria	3–2	Cameroon	21–25	23–25	25–23	25–14	15–9	109–96	Result
5 Mar	Gambia	3–2	Morocco	25–15	25–27	25–21	20–25	16–14	111–102	Result
6 Mar	Cameroon	3–0	Morocco	25–12	25–22	25–17			75–51	Result
6 Mar	Nigeria	3–1	Gambia	25–20	23–25	25–20	25–19		98–84	Result
7 Mar	Cameroon	3–0	Gambia	25–18	25–19	25–16			75–53	Result
8 Mar	Nigeria	3–0	Morocco	25–8	25–21	25–23			75–52	Result

== Final standing ==
Rank	Team
1st place, gold medalist(s)	Nigeria
2nd place, silver medalist(s)	Cameroon
3rd place, bronze medalist(s)	Gambia
4	Morocco

Qualified for the 2021 U19 World Championship

2020 African Champions U19

Nigeria
1st title
