= Arab Volleyball Clubs Championship Cup Winners =

- Sport: Volleyball
- Founded: 2000
- Country: AVA members
- Most recent champion: (Qatar) Al Rayyan SC VB (1st)

The Arab Volleyball Clubs Championship Cup Winners is a sport competition for club volleyball teams who won the cup trophies in their countries, played for the first time in 2000

== Results ==
Year	Host	Final			Third place match		
Year	Host	Champion	Score	Runner-up	Third place	Score	Fourth place
2000; Details	(Libya); Tripoli	(Qatar); Al Rayyan VB	–	(Tunisia); CO Kélibia	(Egypt); Zamalek SC	3 – 0	(Algeria); NRBB
