= 2014 African Volleyball Clubs Champions Championship =

Tournament details
- Host country: Tunisia
- City: Sousse
- Dates: 20 March 2014 – 29 March 2014
- Teams: 21
- Venue(s): 2 (Sousse Hall, M'saken Hall) (in 1 host city)

Final positions
- Champions: (Tunisia) Espérance de Tunis (4th title)
- Runners-up: (Egypt) Al Ahly SC

Tournament statistics
- Best player: (Tunisia) Elyes Karamosli

The 2014 African Volleyball Clubs Champions Championship was the 33rd staging of African's premier club volleyball competition held in Sousse, Tunisia over 20–29 March. The champions of the tournament will qualify for 2014 FIVB Volleyball Club World Championship in Belo Horizonte, Brazil as Africa's representative.

== Group stage ==
The draw was held on 19 March 2014.

Pool A	Pool B	Pool C	Pool D
(Tunisia) Étoile du Sahel; (Algeria) NR Bordj Bou Arréridj; (Cameroon) Bafia Volleyball Evolution; (Morocco) IR Tanger; (Sudan) Al-Nahdha Singa	(Tunisia) CS Sfaxien; (Algeria) Étoile Sportive de Sétif; (Libya) Ittihad Misrata; (Mozambique) Autoridade Tributária; (Democratic Republic of the Congo) Espoir de Kinshasa VC	(Tunisia) Espérance de Tunis; (Libya) Ahly Benghazi; (Uganda) Nemostars; (Kenya) GSU Club; (Cameroon) PA Douala; (Ethiopia) Muger Cement	(Libya) Ahly Tripoli; (Egypt) Al Ahly SC; Kenya Prisons; (Cameroon) FAP Yaoundé; (Seychelles) Beau Vallon

=== Pool A ===
Pos	Team	Pld	W	L	Pts	SW	SL	SR	SPW	SPL	SPR	Qualification
1	(Tunisia) Étoile du Sahel	4	4	0	12	12	1	12.000	323	208	1.553	Quarterfinals
2	(Algeria) NR Bordj Bou Arréridj	4	3	1	9	10	4	2.500	323	261	1.238	Quarterfinals
3	(Morocco) IR Tanger	4	2	2	6	6	6	1.000	241	266	0.906	
4	(Cameroon) Bafia Volleyball Evolution	4	1	3	3	4	10	0.400	264	338	0.781	
5	(Sudan) Al-Nahdha Singa	4	0	4	0	1	12	0.083	243	321	0.757	

Date	Time		Score		Set 1	Set 2	Set 3	Set 4	Set 5	Total	Report
20 Mar	1:08	IR Tanger (Morocco)	0–3	(Algeria) NR Bordj Bou Arréridj	21–25	13–25	06-25			40–50	
20 Mar	0:52	Étoile du Sahel (Tunisia)	3–0	(Cameroon) Bafia Volleyball Evolution	25-09	25–13	25–13			75–26	
21 Mar	1:11	Bafia Volleyball Evolution (Cameroon)	0–3	(Morocco) IR Tanger	21–25	22–25	13–25			56–75	
21 Mar	1:00	Étoile du Sahel (Tunisia)	3–0	(Sudan) Al-Nahdha Singa	25–18	25–21	25-09			75–39	
22 Mar	1:19	IR Tanger (Morocco)	3–0	(Sudan) Al-Nahdha Singa	25–22	25–17	25–21			75–60	
22 Mar	1:31	NR Bordj Bou Arréridj (Algeria)	3–1	(Cameroon) Bafia Volleyball Evolution	25–22	24–26	25–15	25–14		99–77	
23 Mar	1:05	NR Bordj Bou Arréridj (Algeria)	3–0	(Sudan) Al-Nahdha Singa	25–19	25–16	25–11			75–46	
23 Mar		Étoile du Sahel (Tunisia)	3–0	(Morocco) IR Tanger	25–18	25–14	25–19			75–51	
24 Mar	1:36	Al-Nahdha Singa (Sudan)	1–3	(Cameroon) Bafia Volleyball Evolution	22–25	25–21	23–25	19–25		89–96	
24 Mar	1:32	Étoile du Sahel (Tunisia)	3–1	(Algeria) NR Bordj Bou Arréridj	25–21	23–25	25-09	25–19		98–65	

=== Pool B ===
Pos	Team	Pld	W	L	Pts	SW	SL	SR	SPW	SPL	SPR	Qualification
1	(Tunisia) CS Sfaxien	4	4	0	11	12	2	6.000	348	256	1.359	Quarterfinals
2	(Algeria) Étoile Sportive de Sétif	4	3	1	10	11	3	3.667	338	260	1.300	Quarterfinals
3	(Libya) Ittihad Misrata	4	2	2	6	6	7	0.857	277	273	1.015	
4	(Democratic Republic of the Congo) Espoir de Kinshasa VC	4	1	3	3	3	10	0.300	231	307	0.752	
5	(Mozambique) Autoridade Tributária	4	0	4	0	2	12	0.167	243	341	0.713	

Date	Time		Score		Set 1	Set 2	Set 3	Set 4	Set 5	Total	Report
20 Mar	1:32	Autoridade Tributária (Mozambique)	1–3	(Democratic Republic of the Congo) Espoir de Kinshasa VC	25–20	23–25	17–25	17–25		82–95	
20 Mar	2:12	CS Sfaxien (Tunisia)	3–2	(Algeria) Étoile Sportive de Sétif	25–20	28–30	25–23	30–32	15-08	123–105	
21 Mar	0:58	Autoridade Tributária (Mozambique)	0–3	(Algeria) Étoile Sportive de Sétif	08-25	13–25	11–25			32–50	
21 Mar	1:03	CS Sfaxien (Tunisia)	3–0	(Libya) Ittihad Misrata	25–17	25–15	25–20			75–52	
22 Mar	1:08	Étoile Sportive de Sétif (Algeria)	3–0	(Democratic Republic of the Congo) Espoir de Kinshasa VC	25–15	25–16	25–20			75–51	
22 Mar		Autoridade Tributária (Mozambique)	1–3	(Libya) Ittihad Misrata	19–25	17–25	25–21	20–25		81–96	
23 Mar	0:59	CS Sfaxien (Tunisia)	3–0	(Democratic Republic of the Congo) Espoir de Kinshasa VC	25–17	25–17	25-09			75–34	
23 Mar	1:07	Étoile Sportive de Sétif (Algeria)	3–0	(Libya) Ittihad Misrata	25–17	25–17	25–20			75–54	
24 Mar	1:01	CS Sfaxien (Tunisia)	3–0	(Mozambique) Autoridade Tributária	25–20	25–16	25–12			75–48	
24 Mar	0:59	Ittihad Misrata (Libya)	3–0	(Democratic Republic of the Congo) Espoir de Kinshasa VC	25–19	25-09	25–14			75–33	

=== Pool C ===
Pos	Team	Pld	W	L	Pts	SW	SL	SR	SPW	SPL	SPR	Qualification
1	(Tunisia) Espérance de Tunis	5	5	0	15	15	1	15.000	400	278	1.439	Quarterfinals
2	(Libya) Ahly Benghazi	5	4	1	12	13	5	2.600	432	355	1.217	Quarterfinals
3	(Kenya) GSU Club	5	3	2	9	9	7	1.286	346	346	1.000	
4	(Cameroon) PA Douala	5	2	3	5	8	11	0.727	382	423	0.903	
5	(Uganda) Nemostars	5	1	4	4	6	12	0.500	375	395	0.949	
6	(Ethiopia) Muger Cement	5	0	5	0	0	15	0.000	237	375	0.632	

Date	Time		Score		Set 1	Set 2	Set 3	Set 4	Set 5	Total	Report
20 Mar	1:04	PA Douala (Cameroon)	3–0	(Ethiopia) Muger Cement	25–19	25–20	25–13			75–52	
20 Mar	1:08	Espérance de Tunis (Tunisia)	3–0	(Uganda) Nemostars	25–18	25–21	25–16			75–55	
20 Mar	1:13	GSU Club (Kenya)	0–3	(Libya) Ahly Benghazi	19–25	15–25	17–25			51–75	
21 Mar	1:02	GSU Club (Kenya)	3–0	(Uganda) Nemostars	25–20	25–23	25–18			75–61	
21 Mar	1:28	PA Douala (Cameroon)	1–3	(Libya) Ahly Benghazi	10–25	25–22	17–25	19–25		71–97	
21 Mar	0:59	Espérance de Tunis (Tunisia)	3–0	(Ethiopia) Muger Cement	25–13	25–13	25–13			75–39	
22 Mar		Ahly Benghazi (Libya)	3–1	(Uganda) Nemostars	25–17	26–28	25–12	25–23		101–80	
22 Mar	1:04	GSU Club (Kenya)	3–0	(Ethiopia) Muger Cement	25–17	25–14	25–18			75–49	
22 Mar		Espérance de Tunis (Tunisia)	3–0	(Cameroon) PA Douala	25–15	25–17	25–18			75–50	
23 Mar	0:59	Nemostars (Uganda)	3–0	(Ethiopia) Muger Cement	25–19	25–11	25–14			75–44	
23 Mar	1:50	Espérance de Tunis (Tunisia)	3–1	(Libya) Ahly Benghazi	25–15	27–25	23–25	25–19		100–84	
23 Mar	1:27	GSU Club (Kenya)	3–1	(Cameroon) PA Douala	20–25	25–16	25–23	25–22		95–86	
24 Mar	1:38	Nemostars (Uganda)	2–3	(Cameroon) PA Douala	25–13	17–25	27–29	25–18	10–15	104–100	
24 Mar	0:59	Espérance de Tunis (Tunisia)	3–0	(Kenya) GSU Club	25–15	25–14	25–21			75–50	
24 Mar	1:04	Muger Cement (Ethiopia)	0–3	(Libya) Ahly Benghazi	21–25	13–25	19–25			53–75	

=== Pool D ===
Pos	Team	Pld	W	L	Pts	SW	SL	SR	SPW	SPL	SPR	Qualification
1	(Egypt) Al Ahly SC	4	4	0	12	12	1	12.000	322	237	1.359	Quarterfinals
2	(Libya) Ahly Tripoli	4	3	1	9	10	5	2.000	351	316	1.111	Quarterfinals
3	(Cameroon) FAP Yaoundé	4	2	2	6	7	7	1.000	303	303	1.000	
4	Kenya Prisons	4	1	3	3	4	9	0.444	258	314	0.822	
5	(Seychelles) Beau Vallon	4	0	4	0	1	12	0.083	261	325	0.803	

Date	Time		Score		Set 1	Set 2	Set 3	Set 4	Set 5	Total	Report
20 Mar	1:33	Al Ahly SC (Egypt)	3–1	(Libya) Ahly Tripoli	25–22	22–25	25–15	25–19		97–81	
20 Mar	1:18	Kenya Prisons	3–0	(Seychelles) Beau Vallon	25–22	25–19	28–26			78–67	
21 Mar	0:59	Al Ahly SC (Egypt)	3–0	(Seychelles) Beau Vallon	25–15	25–17	25–19			75–51	
21 Mar	1:38	Kenya Prisons	1–3	(Cameroon) FAP Yaoundé	16–25	25–21	15–25	18–25		74–96	
22 Mar		FAP Yaoundé (Cameroon)	3–0	(Seychelles) Beau Vallon	25–19	25–20	25–18			75–57	
22 Mar		Kenya Prisons	0–3	(Libya) Ahly Tripoli	14–25	24–26	23–25			61–76	
23 Mar	1:27	FAP Yaoundé (Cameroon)	1–3	(Libya) Ahly Tripoli	11–25	20–25	25–22	16–25		72–97	
23 Mar	0:56	Kenya Prisons	0–3	(Egypt) Al Ahly SC	13–25	17–25	15–25			45–75	
24 Mar	1:29	Ahly Tripoli (Libya)	3–1	(Seychelles) Beau Vallon	25–23	25–16	22–25	25–22		97–86	
24 Mar	1:08	FAP Yaoundé (Cameroon)	0–3	(Egypt) Al Ahly SC	25–21	25–17	25–22			75–60	

== Knockout stage ==
Quarter-finals
26 March,
(Tunisia) Étoile du Sahel	3
(Libya) Ahly Tripoli	1
26 March,
(Tunisia) Espérance de Tunis	3
(Algeria) Étoile Sportive de Sétif	1
26 March,
(Egypt) Al Ahly SC	3
(Algeria) NR Bordj Bou Arréridj	0
26 March,
(Tunisia) CS Sfaxien	3
(Libya) Ahly Benghazi	0

Semi-finals
27 March,
(Tunisia) Étoile du Sahel	0
(Tunisia) Espérance de Tunis	3
27 March,
(Egypt) Al Ahly SC	3
(Tunisia) CS Sfaxien	2

Final
29 March,
(Tunisia) Espérance de Tunis	3
(Egypt) Al Ahly SC	0
Third place
29 March,
(Tunisia) CS Sfaxien	3
(Tunisia) Étoile du Sahel	1

=== Quarterfinals ===
Date	Time		Score		Set 1	Set 2	Set 3	Set 4	Set 5	Total	Report
26 Mar		Étoile du Sahel (Tunisia)	3–1	(Libya) Ahly Tripoli	25–22	22–25	25–18	25–21		97–86	
26 Mar	1:29	Espérance de Tunis (Tunisia)	3–1	(Algeria) Étoile Sportive de Sétif	26–24	25–17	20–25	25–17		96–83	
26 Mar	1:04	Al Ahly SC (Egypt)	3–0	(Algeria) NR Bordj Bou Arréridj	25–18	25–16	25–18			75–52	
26 Mar	1:02	CS Sfaxien (Tunisia)	3–0	(Libya) Ahly Benghazi	25–14	25–17	25–16			75–47	

=== Semifinals ===
Date	Time		Score		Set 1	Set 2	Set 3	Set 4	Set 5	Total	Report
27 Mar	1:07	Étoile du Sahel (Tunisia)	0–3	(Tunisia) Espérance de Tunis	16–25	20–25	23–25			59–75	
27 Mar	1:56	Al Ahly SC (Egypt)	3–2	(Tunisia) CS Sfaxien	29–27	28–26	17–25	21–25	15–12	110–115	

=== Bronze medal match ===
Date	Time		Score		Set 1	Set 2	Set 3	Set 4	Set 5	Total	Report
29 Mar	01:24	Étoile du Sahel (Tunisia)	1–3	(Tunisia) CS Sfaxien	25–20	15–25	16–25	21–25		77–95	

=== Final ===
Date	Time		Score		Set 1	Set 2	Set 3	Set 4	Set 5	Total	Report
29 Mar	00:59	Espérance de Tunis (Tunisia)	3–0	(Egypt) Al Ahly SC	25–19	25–20	25–14			75–53	

== Final standing ==
Rank	Team
1st place, gold medalist(s)	(Tunisia) Espérance de Tunis
2nd place, silver medalist(s)	(Egypt) Al Ahly SC
3rd place, bronze medalist(s)	(Tunisia) CS Sfaxien
4	(Tunisia) Étoile du Sahel
5	(Algeria) Étoile Sportive de Sétif
6	(Algeria) NR Bordj Bou Arréridj
7	(Libya) Ahly Benghazi
8	(Libya) Ahly Tripoli
9	(Cameroon) FAP Yaoundé
10	Kenya Prisons
11	(Libya) Ittihad Misrata
12	(Kenya) GSU Club
13	(Morocco) IR Tanger
14	(Cameroon) Bafia Volleyball Evolution
15	(Cameroon) PA Douala
16	(Democratic Republic of the Congo) Espoir de Kinshasa VC
17	(Uganda) Nemostars
18	(Seychelles) Beau Vallon
19	(Mozambique) Autoridade Tributária
20	(Sudan) Al-Nahdha Singa
21	(Ethiopia) Muger Cement

Qualified for the 2014 Club World Championship

=== Awards ===
- MVP: (Tunisia) Elyes Karamosli (Espérance de Tunis)
- Best blocker: (Tunisia) Ahmed Kadhi (Étoile du Sahel)
- Best libero: (Tunisia) Anouer Taouerghi (CS Sfaxien)
- Best receiver: (Tunisia) Elyes Karamosli (Espérance de Tunis)
- Best server: (Egypt) Ahmed Abdelal (Al Ahly SC)
- Best setter: (Tunisia) Mehdi Ben Cheikh (Espérance de Tunis)
- Best spiker: (Egypt) Ahmed Kotb (Al Ahly SC)

Source: cavb.org, 30.03.2014
