= 2014 Arab Volleyball Clubs Champions Championship =

Tournament details
- Host country: Tunisia
- City: Tunis, Sidi Bou Said
- Dates: 14 February 2013 – 22 February 2013
- Teams: 18 (from 2 confederations)
- Venue: 2 (in 2 host cities)

Final positions
- Champions: (Tunisia) Espérance Sportive de Tunis (2nd title)
- Runners-up: (Bahrain) Darkulaib Club

The 2014 Arab Clubs Champions Championship was the 32nd edition of Arab world's premier club volleyball tournament held in Tunis and Sidi Bou Said.

== Group stage ==
The draw was held on 13 February 2014.

Pool A	Pool B	Pool C	Pool D
(Tunisia) Espérance Sportive de Tunis; (United Arab Emirates) Bani Yas SC; (Kuwait) Kazma Sporting Club; (Saudi Arabia) Al-Ahli; (Jordan) Al Karmel	(Oman) Saham Club; (Saudi Arabia) Al Shabab SC; (Qatar) Al-Arabi SC; (Iraq) Peshmerga SC; (United Arab Emirates) Al Shabab Al Arabi Club	(Libya) Ittihad Misrata; (Egypt) Petrojet SC; (Qatar) Al Ahli SC; (Oman) Al-Seeb Club	(Libya) Al-Ahly Benghazi; (Bahrain) Darkulaib Club; (Iraq) Gaz Al Janub; (Lebanon) Zahra Club

=== Pool A ===
Pos	Team	Pld	W	L	Pts	SW	SL	SR	SPW	SPL	SPR	Qualification
1	(Tunisia) Espérance Sportive de Tunis	4	4	0	12	12	1	12.000	321	232	1.384	Quarterfinals
2	(Saudi Arabia) Al-Ahli	4	3	1	8	9	6	1.500	340	307	1.107	Quarterfinals
3	(Kuwait) Kazma Sporting Club	4	2	2	7	9	6	1.500	328	308	1.065	
4	(United Arab Emirates) Bani Yas SC	4	1	3	3	4	9	0.444	270	295	0.915	
5	(Jordan) Al Karmel	4	0	4	0	0	12	0.000	183	300	0.610	

Date	Time		Score		Set 1	Set 2	Set 3	Set 4	Set 5	Total	Report
14 Feb	16:00	Kazma Sporting Club (Kuwait)	3–0	(United Arab Emirates) Bani Yas SC	25–20	25–18	25–14			75–52	
14 Feb	14:00	Espérance Sportive de Tunis (Tunisia)	3-0	(Jordan) Al Karmel	25–11	25–15	25–16			75–42	
15 Feb	18:00	Al-Ahli (Saudi Arabia)	3–2	(Kuwait) Kazma Sporting Club	25–22	20–25	25–22	20–25	15-9	105–94	
15 Feb	18:00	Bani Yas SC (United Arab Emirates)	3–0	(Jordan) Al Karmel	25–16	25–12	25–20			75–48	
16 Feb	18:00	Espérance Sportive de Tunis (Tunisia)	3–0	(Saudi Arabia) Al-Ahli	25–23	25–12	27–25			77–60	
16 Feb	18:00	Kazma Sporting Club (Kuwait)	3–0	(Jordan) Al Karmel	25–21	25–17	25–15			75–53	
17 Feb	18:00	Espérance Sportive de Tunis (Tunisia)	3–0	(United Arab Emirates) Bani Yas SC	25–16	25–16	25–19			75–51	
17 Feb	18:00	Al-Ahli (Saudi Arabia)	3–0	(Jordan) Al Karmel	25–20	25–8	25–11			75–39	
18 Feb	18:00	Al-Ahli (Saudi Arabia)	3–1	(United Arab Emirates) Bani Yas SC	21–25	25–23	25–21	25-23		96–69	
18 Feb	18:00	Espérance Sportive de Tunis (Tunisia)	3–1	(Kuwait) Kazma Sporting Club	25–21	25–15	19–25	25-18		94–61	

=== Pool B ===
Pos	Team	Pld	W	L	Pts	SW	SL	SR	SPW	SPL	SPR	Qualification
1	(Oman) Saham Club	4	4	0	11	12	4	3.000	383	347	1.104	Quarterfinals
2	(Qatar) Al-Arabi SC	4	3	1	7	11	9	1.222	446	424	1.052	Quarterfinals
3	(Saudi Arabia) Al Shabab SC	4	2	2	6	9	9	1.000	399	394	1.013	
4	(United Arab Emirates) Al Shabab Al Arabi Club	4	1	3	4	7	10	0.700	383	394	0.972	
5	(Iraq) Peshmerga SC	4	0	4	2	5	12	0.417	341	393	0.868	

Date	Time		Score		Set 1	Set 2	Set 3	Set 4	Set 5	Total	Report
14 Feb	16:00	Saham Club (Oman)	3–2	(Qatar) Al-Arabi SC	27–25	22–25	25–23	20–25	17–15	111–113	
14 Feb	14:00	Al Shabab Al Arabi Club (United Arab Emirates)	1–3	(Saudi Arabia) Al Shabab SC	25–16	21–25	16–25	21–25		83–91	
15 Feb	18:00	Saham Club (Oman)	3–1	(Saudi Arabia) Al Shabab SC	25–19	19–25	25–22	25–22		94–88	
15 Feb	18:00	Al Shabab Al Arabi Club (United Arab Emirates)	3–1	(Iraq) Peshmerga SC	25–17	25–27	26–24	25–19		101–87	
16 Feb	18:00	Al Shabab Al Arabi Club (United Arab Emirates)	1–3	(Oman) Saham Club	18–25	30–28	18–25	23–25		89–103	
16 Feb	18:00	Al-Arabi SC (Qatar)	3–2	(Iraq) Peshmerga SC	25–18	25–19	22–25	19–25	15-7	106–87	
17 Feb	18:00	Peshmerga SC (Iraq)	0–3	(Oman) Saham Club	19–25	16–25	22–25			57–75	
17 Feb	18:00	Al-Arabi SC (Qatar)	3–2	(Saudi Arabia) Al Shabab SC	19–25	25–18	28–30	27–25	15-11	114–98	
18 Feb	18:00	Al Shabab SC (Saudi Arabia)	3-2	(Iraq) Peshmerga SC	26–28	25–21	20–25	25-18	15-11	111–74	
18 Feb	18:00	Al-Arabi SC (Qatar)	3–2	(United Arab Emirates) Al Shabab Al Arabi Club	23–25	25–19	20–25	25–23	20-18	113–92	

=== Pool C ===
Pos	Team	Pld	W	L	Pts	SW	SL	SR	SPW	SPL	SPR	Qualification
1	(Libya) Ittihad Misrata	3	3	0	8	9	2	4.500	258	213	1.211	Quarterfinals
2	(Qatar) Al Ahli SC	3	2	1	6	6	5	1.200	249	234	1.064	Quarterfinals
3	(Egypt) Petrojet SC	3	1	2	3	6	8	0.750	279	317	0.880	
4	(Oman) Al-Seeb Club	3	0	3	1	3	9	0.333	245	267	0.918	

Date	Time		Score		Set 1	Set 2	Set 3	Set 4	Set 5	Total	Report
14 Feb	16:00	Petrojet SC (Egypt)	2–3	(Libya) Ittihad Misrata	25–23	25–20	23–25	17–25	6–15	96–108	
15 Feb	16:00	Al-Seeb Club (Oman)	1–3	(Qatar) Al Ahli SC	25–15	15–25	21–25	17-25		78–65	
16 Feb	16:00	Petrojet SC (Egypt)	1-3	(Qatar) Al Ahli SC	19–25	26–24	15-25	21–25		81–74	
16 Feb	16:00	Ittihad Misrata (Libya)	3–0	(Oman) Al-Seeb Club	25–18	25–16	25–13			75–47	
17 Feb	16:00	Petrojet SC (Egypt)	3-2	(Oman) Al-Seeb Club	28–26	25–21	16-25	18–25	15-13	102–72	
18 Feb	16:00	Ittihad Misrata (Libya)	3–0	(Qatar) Al Ahli SC	25–17	25–20	25–23			75–60	

=== Pool D ===
Pos	Team	Pld	W	L	Pts	SW	SL	SR	SPW	SPL	SPR	Qualification
1	(Bahrain) Darkulaib Club	4	3	1	8	9	4	2.250	302	277	1.090	Quarterfinals
2	(Lebanon) Zahra Club	3	2	1	6	7	4	1.750	256	232	1.103	Quarterfinals
3	(Libya) Al-Ahly Benghazi	3	1	2	3	7	7	1.000	287	300	0.957	
4	(Iraq) Gaz Al Janub	3	0	3	1	4	9	0.444	278	314	0.885	

Date	Time		Score		Set 1	Set 2	Set 3	Set 4	Set 5	Total	Report
14 Feb	13:00	Zahra Club (Lebanon)	3–1	(Iraq) Gaz Al Janub	25–14	23–25	25–19	25–15		98–73	
15 Feb	18:00	Al-Ahly Benghazi (Libya)	2–3	(Bahrain) Darkulaib Club	21–25	25–21	22–25	25–22	13-15	106–93	
16 Feb	16:00	Zahra Club (Lebanon)	1-3	(Bahrain) Darkulaib Club	19–25	21–25	25–21	16–25		81–96	
16 Feb	18:00	Al-Ahly Benghazi (Libya)	3-2	(Iraq) Gaz Al Janub	28–30	25–23	30–28	20–25	15-10	118–106	
17 Feb	16:00	Gaz Al Janub (Iraq)	1-3	(Bahrain) Darkulaib Club	22–25	23–25	25–23	19–25		89–98	
17 Feb	18:00	Al-Ahly Benghazi (Libya)	0-3	(Lebanon) Zahra Club	24–26	23–25	16–25			63–76	

== Knockout stage ==
Quarter-finals
20 February, 27-25 25-22 25-19
(Tunisia) Espérance de Tunis	3
(Qatar) Al Ahli SC	0
20 February, 21-25 19-25 25-18 25-16 13-15
(Oman) Saham Club	2
(Lebanon) Zahra Club	3
20 February, 25-20 25-20 22-25 25-23
(Bahrain) Darkulaib Club	3
(Qatar) Al-Arabi SC	1
20 February, 25-22 31-29 25-23
(Libya) Ittihad Misrata	3
(Saudi Arabia) Al-Ahli	0

Semi-finals
21 February, 25-21 25-11 25-19
(Tunisia) Espérance de Tunis	3
(Lebanon) Zahra Club	0
21 February, 15-25 25-16 25-18 25-17
(Bahrain) Darkulaib Club	3
(Libya) Ittihad Misrata	1

Final
22 February, 28-26 25-20 25-17
(Tunisia) Espérance de Tunis	3
(Bahrain) Darkulaib Club	0
Third place
22 February, 25-18 25-22 25-23
(Libya) Ittihad Misrata	3
(Lebanon) Zahra Club	0

=== Quarterfinals ===
Date	Time		Score		Set 1	Set 2	Set 3	Set 4	Set 5	Total	Report
20 Feb	12:00	Darkulaib Club (Bahrain)	3–1	(Qatar) Al-Arabi SC	25-20	25-20	22-25	25-23	-	97–0	
20 Feb	14:00	Saham Club (Oman)	2–3	(Lebanon) Zahra Club	21-25	19-25	25-18	25-16	13-15	103–0	
20 Feb	16:00	Ittihad Misrata (Libya)	3–0	(Saudi Arabia) Al-Ahli	25-22	31-29	25-23	-	-	81–0	
20 Feb	18:00	Espérance Sportive de Tunis (Tunisia)	3–0	(Qatar) Al Ahli SC	27-25	25-22	25-19	-	-	77–0	

=== Semifinals ===
Date	Time		Score		Set 1	Set 2	Set 3	Set 4	Set 5	Total	Report
21 Feb	15:00	Ittihad Misrata (Libya)	1–3	(Bahrain) Darkulaib Club	25-15	16-25	18-25	17-25	-	76–0	
21 Feb	18:00	Espérance Sportive de Tunis (Tunisia)	3–0	(Lebanon) Zahra Club	25-21	25-11	25-19	-	-	75–0	

==== Bronze medal match ====
Date	Time		Score		Set 1	Set 2	Set 3	Set 4	Set 5	Total	Report
22 Feb	15:00	Ittihad Misrata (Libya)	3–0	(Lebanon) Zahra Club	25-18	25-22	25-23	-	-	75–0	

=== Final ===
Date	Time		Score		Set 1	Set 2	Set 3	Set 4	Set 5	Total	Report
22 Feb	18:00	Espérance Sportive de Tunis (Tunisia)	3–0	(Bahrain) Darkulaib Club	28-26	25-20	25-17	-	-	78–0	

== Final standing ==
Rank	Team
1st place, gold medalist(s)	(Tunisia) Espérance de Tunis
2nd place, silver medalist(s)	(Bahrain) Darkulaib Club
3rd place, bronze medalist(s)	(Libya) Ittihad Misrata
4	(Lebanon) Zahra Club
5	(Qatar) Al-Arabi SC
6	(Qatar) Al Ahli SC
7	(Saudi Arabia) Al-Ahli
8	(Oman) Saham Club
9	(Kuwait) Kazma Sporting Club
10	(Saudi Arabia) Al Shabab SC
11	(Libya) Al-Ahly Benghazi
12	(Egypt) Petrojet SC
13	(Iraq) Gaz Al Janub
14	(United Arab Emirates) Bani Yas SC
15	(United Arab Emirates) Al Shabab Al Arabi Club
16	(Oman) Al-Seeb Club
17	(Iraq) Peshmerga SC
18	(Jordan) Al Karmel

== Awards ==
- Best scorer: (Cuba) Rafael Raidel (Ittihad Misrata)
- Best spiker: (Tunisia) Hichem Kaabi (Espérance de Tunis)
- Best blocker: (Republic of the Congo) Ilouoni Exo (Darkulaib Club)
- Best server: (Venezuela) Jhonlenn Barreto (Zahra Club)
- Best setter: (Tunisia) Mehdi Ben Cheikh (Espérance de Tunis)
- Best receiver: (Bahrain) Ali Mohammed (Darkulaib Club)
- Best libero: (Tunisia) Saddem Hmissi (Espérance de Tunis)

Source: alwasat news, 23.02.2014
