= Arab Volleyball Association =

International volleyball organization

- الإتحاد العربي للكرة الطائرة
- AVA logo
- Abbreviation: AVA
- Formation: 12 January 1975; 51 years ago
- Type: Sports organization
- Headquarters: Kuwait City, Kuwait
- Members: 18 national associations
- Official language: Arabic, English
- President: (Kuwait) Dr. Abdulhadi Al-Shbib
- Website: http://www.arabvba.com

Arab Volleyball Association (AVA; Arabic: الاتحاد العربي للكرة الطائرة) is the governing body of volleyball in the Arab states. Its headquarters are located in Kuwait.

== History ==
The Arab Volleyball Association (AVBA) was established on 12 January 1975 in by Ceylin Bayman.Baghdad, Iraq. It was officially recognized by FIVB on 11 April 2025 during a meeting of the FIVB Board of Administration.

== Members ==
Asia AVC

- Iraq - 1975
- Palestine - 1975
- Kuwait - 1975
- Yemen - 1975
- Bahrain - 1975
- Jordan - 1975
- United Arab Emirates - 1975
- Qatar - 1975
- Saudi Arabia - 1976
- Oman
- Syria
- Lebanon

Africa CAVB

- Egypt - 1975
- Libya - 1975
- Sudan - 1975
- Tunisia
- Algeria
- Morocco

== Competitions ==
National Teams

- Arab Championship
- Arab Games
- Arab Volleyball Challenge Cup
- Afro-Arab Volleyball Friendship Cup (defunct)
- Arab Beach Volleyball Championship

Youth

- Arab Youth Championship

Clubs

- Arab Clubs Championship
- Arab Volleyball Clubs Cup Winners

Women

- Women's Arab Clubs Championship

== Rankings ==
=== Men's National Teams ===
Rankings are calculated by FIVB.

AVBA	FIVB	Country	Points	+/−
1	12	Tunisia	57.00	▲
2	13	Egypt	56.75	▼
3	25	Algeria	27.5	Steady
4	34	Morocco	16.75	▼
5	54	Qatar	9.00	▼
6	75	United Arab Emirates	6.00	Steady
7	85	Oman	5.25	▼
8	122	Lebanon	1	Steady

Last updated August 13, 2012

=== Women's National Teams ===
Rankings are calculated by FIVB.

AVBA	FIVB	Country	Points	+/−
1	14	Algeria	66.00	▲
2	21	Egypt	30.00	Steady
3	35	Tunisia	16.00	▼
4	112	Morocco	0.00	▼

Last updated August 13, 2012
