= 2008 African Volleyball Championship U19 =

Tournament details
- Host country: Egypt
- Dates: December 21–25
- Teams: 5
- Venue: 1 (in 1 host city)

Final positions
- Champions: Tunisia (6th title)

Tournament awards
- MVP: (Tunisia) Ibrahim Besbes

The 2008 African Volleyball Championship U19 was the tenth edition of the African Volleyball Championship U19. It was held in Cairo, Egypt, from December 21 to December 25, 2008. The top three teams will qualify for the 2009 Youth World Championship.

== Teams ==
- Algeria
- Burundi
- Egypt
- Libya
- Tunisia

== Competition system ==
The competition system of the 2008 African Championship U19 is the single Round-Robin system. Each team plays once against each of the 4 remaining teams. Points are accumulated during the whole tournament, and the final ranking is determined by the total points gained.

=== Championship ===
Pos	Team	Pld	W	L	Pts	SW	SL	SR	SPW	SPL	SPR
1	Tunisia	4	4	0	8	12	1	12.000	322	217	1.484
2	Egypt	4	3	1	7	9	3	3.000	277	220	1.259
3	Algeria	4	2	2	6	7	6	1.167	285	289	0.986
4	Burundi	4	1	3	5	3	10	0.300	265	313	0.847
5	Libya	4	0	4	4	1	12	0.083	213	323	0.659

== Results ==
- All times are Egypt Standard Time (UTC+02:00).

Date	Time		Score		Set 1	Set 2	Set 3	Set 4	Set 5	Total	Report
21 Dec	18:00	Egypt	3–0	Libya	25–17	25–9	25–15			75–41	Report
21 Dec	20:00	Tunisia	3–1	Algeria	22–25	25–10	25–22	25-20		97–57	Report
22 Dec	16:00	Libya	0–3	Algeria	22–25	17–25	14–25			53–75	Report
22 Dec	18:00	Egypt	3–0	Burundi	25–16	25–17	25–15			75–48	Report
23 Dec	16:00	Burundi	3–1	Libya	22–25	25–20	26–24	25-17		98–69	Report
23 Dec	18:00	Tunisia	3–0	Egypt	25–17	25–15	25–20			75–52	Report
24 Dec	16:00	Burundi	0–3	Tunisia	23–25	19–25	13–25			55–75	Report
24 Dec	18:00	Egypt	3–0	Algeria	25–22	25–17	25–17			75–56	Report
25 Dec	15:00	Libya	0–3	Tunisia	8–25	18–25	7–25			33–75	Report
25 Dec	18:00	Algeria	3–0	Burundi	25–18	25–21	27–25			77–64	Report

== Final standing ==
Rank	Team
Gold medal	Tunisia
Silver medal	Egypt
Bronze medal	Algeria
4	Burundi
5	Libya

Qualified for the 2009 World Youth Championship

2008 African Youth champions

Tunisia
Sixth title

Team Roster
Hatem Obba, Ibrahim Besbes, Mohamed Ayech, Saddem Hmissi, Mohamed Arbi Ben Abdallah, Bahri Ben Massoud, Mahdi Sammoud, Mohamed Ali Ben Othmen Miladi, Ali Ben Abdallah, Racem Siala, Sadam Ben Daoud, Khalil Bouazizi

Head Coach: Lotfi Ben Slimane

== Awards ==
- MVP: (Tunisia) Ibrahim Besbes
- Best spiker: (Burundi) Innocent Irdukunda
- Best blocker: (Egypt) Mohamed Khatab
- Best server: (Egypt) Ahmed Elkotb
- Best setter: (Tunisia) Mahdi Sammoud
- Best receiver: (Tunisia) Saddem Hmissi
