= 2016 African Volleyball Championship U19 =

Tournament details
- Host country: Tunisia
- Dates: 8–10 September
- Teams: 4
- Venue: 1 (in 1 host city)

Final positions
- Champions: Tunisia (8th title)

Tournament awards
- MVP: Mohammed Salah Fehri

The 2016 African Volleyball Championship U19 was held in Kelibia, Tunisia from 8 to 10 September 2016. The champion qualified for the 2017 U19 World Championship.

== Teams ==
- Tunisia (Hosts)
- Rwanda
- Egypt
- Morocco

== Results ==
Pos	Team	Pld	W	L	Pts	SW	SL	SR	SPW	SPL	SPR
1	Tunisia	3	3	0	9	9	1	9.000	247	202	1.223
2	Egypt	3	2	1	6	6	4	1.500	233	208	1.120
3	Morocco	3	1	2	3	3	6	0.500	184	213	0.864
4	Rwanda	3	0	3	0	2	9	0.222	221	262	0.844

Date		Score		Set 1	Set 2	Set 3	Set 4	Set 5	Total
8 Sep	Egypt	3–0	Morocco	25–19	25–14	25–17			75–50
8 Sep	Tunisia	3–1	Rwanda	25–20	18–25	25–15	25-19		93–79
9 Sep	Rwanda	1–3	Egypt	25–19	22–25	15–25	21–25		83–94
9 Sep	Tunisia	3–0	Morocco	29–27	25–15	25–17			79–59
10 Sep	Rwanda	0–3	Morocco	22–25	17–25	20–25	–	–	59–75
10 Sep	Tunisia	3–0	Egypt	25–23	25–19	25–22	–	–	75–64

== Final standing ==
Rank	Team
Gold medal	Tunisia
Silver medal	Egypt
Bronze medal	Morocco
4	Rwanda

Qualified for the 2017 U19 World Championship

2016 African Champions U19

Tunisia
8th title

Team Roster

A.Lakenji (L), A.A.Makni, G.Hmaied, M.Jenhani, S.Chaaben, N.Mhemdi, A.El Khadim (C), S.Naffeti, K.Langliz, M.S.Fehri, A.Ghariani, H.Khazri, Y.Abdelhedi, M.A.Toubib (L)

Head Coach: Yassine Sghairi

== Awards ==
- MVP: (Tunisia) Mohammed Salah Fehri
- Best spiker: (Egypt) Muyasser Abu Rayyan
- Best blocker: (Tunisia) Mohammed Salah Fehri
- Best server: (Rwanda) Henri Marciel
- Best setter: (Tunisia) Atef El Khadim
- Best receiver: (Morocco) Oussama Alazhari
- Best libero: (Egypt) Adham Abderrahim
