= Arab Youth Volleyball Championship =

- Current season, competition or edition: 2025 Arab Youth Volleyball Championship
- Sport: Volleyball
- Founded: 1983
- First season: 1983
- Country: AVA members
- Most recent champions: Egypt (2025) (1st title)
- Most titles: Tunisia; Bahrain (4 titles)
- Website: http://www.arabvolleyball.org/

The Arab Youth Volleyball Championship is a sport competition for national teams with players under 19 years, currently held biannually and organized by the Arab Volleyball Association.

== Results ==
=== Summary ===
| Year | Host | Final | | | Third place match | | |
| Year | Host | Champion | Score | Runner-up | Third place | Score | Fourth place |
|---|---|---|---|---|---|---|---|
| 1983; Details | (Saudi Arabia); Riyadh | Saudi Arabia | – | | | – | |
| 1988; Details | (Egypt); Alexandria | Qatar | – | | | – | Kuwait |
| 1992; Details | Tunisia | Tunisia | – | | | – | |
| 1994; Details | Egypt | Tunisia | – | Bahrain | | – | |
| 1996; Details | Egypt | Tunisia | 3 – 2 | Egypt | | – | |
| 1998; Details | Bahrain | Saudi Arabia | – | Bahrain | Tunisia | – | |
| 2000; Details | (Jordan); Amman | Bahrain | No playoffs | Saudi Arabia | Qatar | No playoffs | Jordan |
| 2002; Details | (Qatar); Doha | Qatar | – | Saudi Arabia | | – | |
| 2007; Details | (Syria); Latakia | Yemen | 3 – 0 | Bahrain | Kuwait | 3 – 1 | Tunisia |
| 2009; Details | (Lebanon); Beirut | Tunisia | 3 – 0 | Egypt | Saudi Arabia | 3 – 2 | Iraq |
| 2011; Details | (Egypt); Hurghada | Bahrain | 3 – 0 | Tunisia | Egypt | 3 – 0 | Algeria |
| 2013; Details | (Tunisia); Sidi Bou Said | Bahrain | 3 – 1 | Tunisia | Qatar | 3 – 0 | Yemen |
| 2015; Details | (Morocco); Salé | Algeria | 3 – 0 | Morocco | Qatar | 3 – 0 | Tunisia |
| 2017; Details | (Jordan); Amman | Bahrain | | Oman | Iraq | | |
| 2019; Details | (Jordan); Amman | Egypt | 3 – 0 | Bahrain | | | |
| 2025; Details | (Jordan); Amman | Egypt | 3 – 2 | Bahrain | Libya | 3 - 1 | Lebanon |

=== Medal table ===
| Rank | Nation | Gold | Silver | Bronze | Total |
|---|---|---|---|---|---|
| 1 | Bahrain | 4 | 5 | 0 | 9 |
| 2 | Tunisia | 4 | 2 | 1 | 7 |
| 3 | Egypt | 2 | 2 | 1 | 5 |
| 3 | Saudi Arabia | 2 | 2 | 1 | 5 |
| 5 | Qatar | 2 | 0 | 3 | 5 |
| 6 | Algeria | 1 | 0 | 0 | 1 |
| 6 | Yemen | 1 | 0 | 0 | 1 |
| 8 | Morocco | 0 | 1 | 0 | 1 |
| 8 | Oman | 0 | 1 | 0 | 1 |
| 10 | Kuwait | 0 | 0 | 1 | 1 |
| 10 | Libya | 0 | 0 | 1 | 1 |
| Totals (11 entries) | | 16 | 13 | 8 | 37 |
