= 2015 African Volleyball Championship U19 =

Tournament details
- Host country: Tunisia
- Dates: 21–24 January
- Teams: 3
- Venue: 1 (in 1 host city)

Final positions
- Champions: Egypt (4th title)

The 2015 African Volleyball Championship U19 was held in Kelibia, Tunisia from 21 to 24 January 2015. All 3 teams qualified for the 2015 U19 World Championship.

== Teams ==
- Tunisia (Hosts)
- Egypt
- Algeria

== Results ==
Pos	Team	Pld	W	L	Pts	SW	SL	SR	SPW	SPL	SPR
1	Egypt	2	2	0	5	6	2	3.000	183	154	1.188
2	Tunisia	2	1	1	4	5	4	1.250	203	179	1.134
3	Algeria	2	0	2	0	1	6	0.167	120	173	0.694

Date		Score		Set 1	Set 2	Set 3	Set 4	Set 5	Total
21 Jan	Egypt	3–0	Algeria	25–16	25–15	25–18			75–49
23 Jan *	Tunisia	3–1	Algeria	23–25	25–17	25–15	25–14		98–71
24 Jan	Egypt	3–2	Tunisia	25–22	24–26	19–25	25–21	15–11	108–105

* This match was originally scheduled for 22 January, but it was postponed.

== Final standing ==
Rank	Team
Gold medal	Egypt
Silver medal	Tunisia
Bronze medal	Algeria

Qualified for the 2015 U19 World Championship

2015 African Champions U19

Egypt
4th title

== Awards ==
- Best spiker

(Egypt) Marwouan Moustafa

- Best setter

(Egypt) Zyad Elsisy
