= 2010 African Volleyball Championship U19 =

Tournament details
- Host country: South Africa
- Dates: 13–18 September
- Teams: 5
- Venue: 1 (in 1 host city)

Final positions
- Champions: Tunisia (7th title)

Tournament awards
- MVP: (Egypt) Marawan Mohamed

The 2010 African Volleyball Championship U19 was held in Cape Town, South Africa, from 13 to 18 September 2010. The finalists will qualify for the 2011 Youth World Championship.

== Teams ==
- Algeria
- Egypt
- Morocco
- South Africa
- Tunisia

== Competition system ==
The competition system of the 2010 African Championship U19 is the single Round-Robin system. Each team plays once against each of the 4 remaining teams. Points are accumulated during the whole tournament, and the final ranking is determined by the total points gained.

=== Championship ===
Pos	Team	Pld	W	L	Pts	SW	SL	SR	SPW	SPL	SPR
1	Tunisia	4	4	0	8	12	2	6.000	329	241	1.365
2	Egypt	4	3	1	7	9	4	2.250	316	237	1.333
3	Morocco	4	2	2	6	9	8	1.125	372	379	0.982
4	South Africa	4	1	3	5	5	10	0.500	297	333	0.892
5	Algeria	4	0	4	4	1	12	0.083	199	323	0.616

== Results ==
- All times are South African Standard Time (UTC+02:00).

Date	Time		Score		Set 1	Set 2	Set 3	Set 4	Set 5	Total	Report
13 Sep	17:00	Tunisia	3–0	Algeria	25–16	25–11	25–7			75–34	Report
13 Sep	19:00	Morocco	3–2	South Africa	23–25	25–21	20–25	25-23	19-17	112–71	Report
14 Sep	17:00	Egypt	3–1	Morocco	19–25	27–25	25–20	25-20		96–70	Report
14 Sep	19:00	Tunisia	3–0	South Africa	25–17	25–10	25–17			75–44	Report
15 Sep	17:00	Tunisia	3–0	Egypt	25–23	25–22	25–23			75–68	Report
15 Sep	19:00	South Africa	3–1	Algeria	23–25	25–19	25–14	25-13		98–58	Report
17 Sep	17:00	Egypt	3–0	Algeria	25–8	25–4	25–16			75–28	Report
17 Sep	19:00	Tunisia	3–2	Morocco	25–13	24–26	25–21	15-25	15-10	104–60	Report
18 Sep	14:00	Morocco	3–0	Algeria	25–21	25–23	25–22			75–66	Report
18 Sep	16:00	Egypt	3–0	South Africa	25–14	25–19	25–11			75–44	Report

== Final standing ==
Rank	Team
Gold medal	Tunisia
Silver medal	Egypt
Bronze medal	Morocco
4	South Africa
5	Algeria

Qualified for the 2011 World Youth Championship

2010 African Youth champions

Tunisia
Seventh title

Team Roster
Oussama Mrika, Achraf Naceur, Khaled Ben Slimene, Mohamed Brahem, Atef Belkahla, Montassar Ben Brahem, Adam Oueslati, Elyes Garfi, Malek Chekir, Mohamed Amine Hatira, Bilel Boughattas, Rami Wasli
Head Coach: Hichem Ben Romdhane

== Awards ==
- MVP: (Egypt) Marawan Mohamed
- Best spiker: (Tunisia) Malek Chekir
- Best blocker: (Egypt) Mohamed Metawae
- Best server: (Tunisia) Oussama Mrika
- Best setter: (Morocco) Amine Zayani
- Best receiver: (South Africa) Dean Layters
- Best libero: (Egypt) Mohamed Hassan
