= 2006 African Volleyball Championship U19 =

Tournament details
- Host country: Tunisia
- Dates: August 20–22
- Teams: 3
- Venue: 1 (in 1 host city)

Final positions
- Champions: Tunisia (5th title)

The 2006 African Volleyball Championship U19 was the eighth edition of the African Volleyball Championship U19. It was held in Kelibia, Tunisia, from August 20 to August 22, 2006. The top two teams will qualify for the 2007 Youth World Championship.

== Teams ==
- Algeria
- Egypt
- Tunisia

== Competition system ==
The competition system of the 2006 African Championship U19 is the single Round-Robin system. Each team plays once against each of the 2 remaining teams. Points are accumulated during the whole tournament, and the final ranking is determined by the total points gained.

=== Championship ===
Pos	Team	Pld	W	L	Pts	SW	SL	SR	SPW	SPL	SPR
1	Tunisia	2	2	0	4	6	0	MAX	0	0	—
2	Egypt	2	1	1	3	3	4	0.750	0	0	—
3	Algeria	2	0	2	2	1	6	0.167	0	0	—

== Results ==
Date	Time		Score		Set 1	Set 2	Set 3	Set 4	Set 5	Total	Report
20 Aug		Egypt	3–1	Algeria	–	–	–			0–0	
21 Aug		Tunisia	3–0	Egypt	–	–	–	-		0–0	
22 Aug		Tunisia	3–0	Algeria	25–10	25–14	25–15			75–39	

== Final standing ==
Rank	Team
Gold medal	Tunisia
Silver medal	Egypt
Bronze medal	Algeria

Qualified for the 2007 World Youth Championship

2006 African Youth champions

Tunisia
Fifth title
