= Espérance Sportive de Tunis (volleyball) =

Tunisian volleyball club

- Full name: Espérance Sportive de Tunis Volleyball
- Short name: EST
- Founded: 1956
- Ground: Salle Mohamed-Zouaoui, Tunis
- Chairman: (Tunisia) Hamdi Meddeb
- Manager: (Tunisia) Hichem Kaabi
- League: Tunisian Volleyball League
- 2025–26: 1st
- Website: Club home page

Uniforms
Home	Away

The Espérance Sportive de Tunis Volleyball (Arabic: الترجي الرياضي التونسي للكرة الطائرة, often referred to as EST) is one of Espérance Sportive de Tunis club's sections that represent the club in Tunisia and international volleyball competitions, the club team section based in capital Tunis since the year 1956.

== History ==
Espérance Sportive de Tunis (EST) established its volleyball section in 1956, expanding the club's rich sports legacy. Over the decades, the team has become a dominant force in Tunisian and African volleyball.

In the 2019–2020 season, EST secured their 20th national championship title after defeating CO Kelibia 3-0.

The team's home matches are held at the Salle Mohamed-Zouaoui in Tunis. As of the latest season, the squad includes notable players such as Skander Ben Tara (Middle Blocker), Elyes Karamosli (Outside Hitter), and team captain Mehdi Ben Cheikh (Setter).

Under the leadership of head coach Hichem Kaabi and assistant coach Karim Ben Ayed, Espérance Sportive de Tunis continues to be at presence in volleyball, both nationally and internationally.

== Honours ==
=== National Achievements ===
- Tunisian League :

Winners (26x titles) : 1963–64, 1964–65, 1965–66, 1966–67, 1967–68, 1968–69, 1975–76, 1977–78, 1992–93, 1995–96, 1996–97, 1997–98, 1998–99, 2006–07, 2007–08, 2014–15, 2015–16, 2017–18, 2018–19, 2019–20, 2020–21, 2021–22, 2022–23, 2023–24, 2024–25, 2025-26
Runners up (9x times) : 1978–79, 1984–85, 1993–94, 1994–95, 1999–00, 2005–06, 2009–10, 2010–11, 2013–14
Third (3x times) : 1962–63, 2000–01, 2011–12

- Tunisian Cup :

Winners (24x cups) : 1963–64, 1964–65, 1965–66, 1966–67, 1979–80, 1992–93, 1993–94, 1995–96, 1996–97, 1998–99, 1999–20, 2006–07, 2009–10, 2013–14, 2016-17, 2017-18, 2018-19, 2019-20, 2020-21, 2021-22, 2022-23, 2023-24, 2024-25, 2025-26
Runners up (10x vice champions) : 1967–68, 1968–69, 1974–75, 1978–79, 1997–98, 2008–09, 2011–12, 2012–13, 2014–15, 2015–16

- Tunisian Supercup :

Winners (10x Supercups) : 2007–08, 2008–09, 2017–18, 2018–19, 2019-20, 2020–21, 2021–22, 2022–23, 2023–24, 2024-25

=== Regional Achievements ===
- Arab Clubs Championship :

Winners (2x titles) : 2007, 2014
Runners up (5x vice champions) : 1978, 1992, 2008, 2018, 2019
Third (1x time) : 1996

=== International Achievements ===
- African Club Championship :

Winners (5x titles) : 1994, 1998, 2000, 2014, 2021
Runners up (5x vice champions) : 1999, 2013, 2015, 2016, 2022

- African Volleyball Cup Winners' Cup :

Runners up (1 x vice champions) : 1994

== Team squad 2025/26 ==
No	Player name	Nationality	Position	Height (cm)	Year of birth
5	Marouane M’rabet	Tunisia	Setter	186	1985
—	Youssef Dabbagh	Tunisia	Setter	186	—
7	Hamza Nagga	Tunisia	Opposite	191	1990
3	Ilyès Karamosli	Tunisia	Outside Hitter	194	1989
11	Malek Chekir	Tunisia	Outside Hitter	190	1993
—	Konrad Formela	Poland	Outside Hitter	194	1995
—	Mohamed Ali Ben Othmen	Tunisia	Outside Hitter	191	1991
1	Nabil Miladi	Tunisia	Middle-blocker	196	1988
2	Ahmed Kadhi	Tunisia	Middle-blocker	199	1989
13	Salim Mbarki	Tunisia	Middle-blocker	200	1999
—	Iyed Ben Azzouz	Tunisia	Middle-blocker	190	2009
—	Malek Ben Mabrouk	Tunisia	Libero	185	2003
—	Firas Ben Othmen	Tunisia	Universal	194	2006

== Staff ==
Name	Nationality	Role
Hichem Kaâbi	Tunisia	Head coach
Ihsen Saïdi	Tunisia	Coach assistant
Ahmed Bida	Tunisia	Statistician
Ahmed Bida	Tunisia	Physical preparation coach

== Team ==
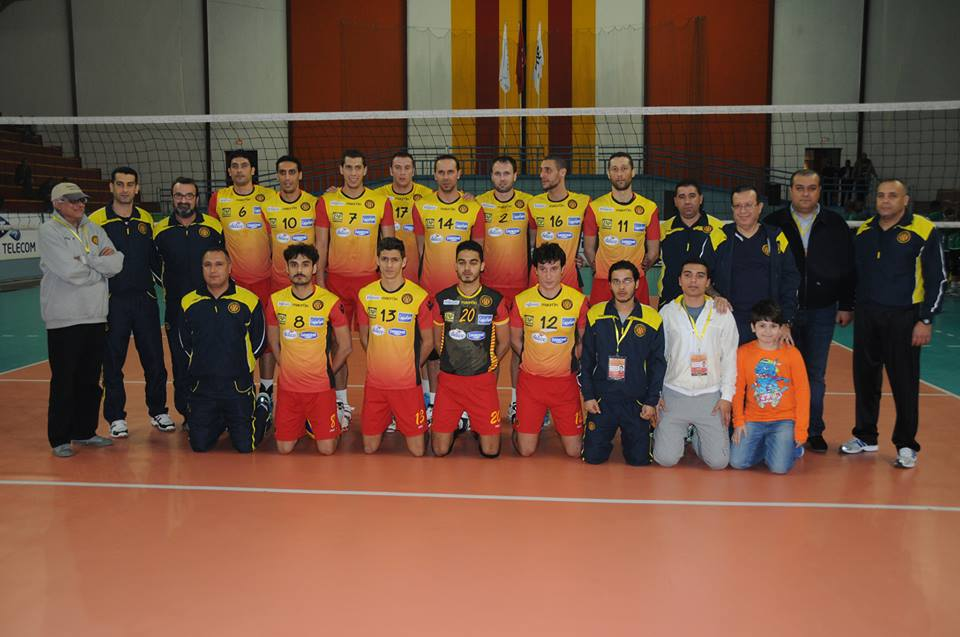
Team in the Arab volleyball championship, February 2014
