= Boys' U18 African Nations Volleyball Championship =

International youth volleyball competition

Men's U18 African Volleyball Championship
- Current season, competition or edition: 2024 Men's U18 African Volleyball Championship
- Sport: Volleyball
- Founded: 1994
- First season: 1994
- Continent: CAVB (Africa)
- Most recent champion: Tunisia (9th title)
- Most titles: Tunisia (9 titles)

The Men's U18 African Volleyball Championship is a sport competition for national teams with players under 18 years, currently held biannually and organized by the African Volleyball Confederation, the Africa volleyball federation. The competition was played with teams of U19 till the 2022 edition.

== Result summary ==
=== Men's U19 African Volleyball Championship ===
Year	Host	Final			3rd place match		
Year	Host	Champions	Score	Runners-up	3rd place	Score	4th place
1994; Details	(Morocco); Casablanca	Tunisia	3–1	Morocco	Algeria		
1997; Details	(South Africa); Durban	Tunisia	3–1	Algeria		–	Morocco
1998; Details	(Tunisia); Radès	Tunisia	3–1	Algeria	Morocco		
2000; Details	(Egypt); Alexandria	Tunisia	–	Algeria		–	Morocco
2002; Details	(Morocco); Casablanca	Egypt	3–1	Tunisia	Morocco	–	Sudan
2004; Details	(South Africa); Durban	Egypt	3–2	Tunisia	Sudan	–	South Africa
2006; Details	(Tunisia); Kelibia	Tunisia	Round-robin	Egypt	Algeria	—N/a	
2008; Details	(Egypt); Cairo	Tunisia	Round-robin	Egypt	Algeria	Round-robin	Burundi
2010; Details	(South Africa); Cape Town	Tunisia	Round-robin	Egypt	Morocco	Round-robin	South Africa
2013; Details	(Algeria); Sétif	Egypt	Round-robin	Tunisia	Rwanda	Round-robin	Algeria
2015; Details	(Tunisia); Kelibia	Egypt	Round-robin	Tunisia	Algeria	—N/a	
2016; Details	(Tunisia); Kelibia	Tunisia	Round-robin	Egypt	Morocco	Round-robin	Rwanda
2020; Details	(Nigeria); Abuja	Nigeria	Round-robin	Cameroon	Gambia	Round-robin	Morocco
2022; Details	(Morocco); El Jadida	Nigeria	3–0	Egypt	Cameroon	3–1	Tunisia

=== Men's U18 African Volleyball Championship ===
Year	Host	Final			3rd place match		
Year	Host	Champions	Score	Runners-up	3rd place	Score	4th place
2024; Details	(Tunisia); Tunis	Tunisia	3–2	Egypt	Algeria	3–0	Kenya
2026; Details	(Egypt); Alexandria	Nigeria	3–0	Egypt	Cameroon	3–0	Tunisia

== Performance by nation ==
N°	Team	Champions	Runners-up	3rd place	Total
1	Tunisia	9 (1994, 1997, 1998, 2000, 2006, 2008, 2010, 2016, 2024)	4 (2002, 2004, 2013, 2015)		12
2	Egypt	4 (2002, 2004, 2013, 2015)	7 (2006, 2008, 2010, 2016, 2021, 2024, 2026)	1 (2000)	12
3	Nigeria	3 (2020, 2022, 2026)			3
4	Algeria		3 (1997, 1998, 2000)	5 (1994, 2006, 2008, 2015, 2024)	7
5	Morocco		1 (1994)	4 (1998, 2002, 2010, 2016)	5
6	Cameroon		1 (2020)	2 (2022, 2026)	3
7	Sudan			1 (2004)	1
7	Rwanda			1 (2013)	1
7	Gambia			1 (2020)	1

== See also ==
- Girls' Africa Volleyball Championship U18
