= Kuwait men's national volleyball team =

National volleyball team

Kuwait
- Association: Kuwait Volleyball Association (KVA)
- Confederation: AVC
- Head coach: Julián Álvarez
- FIVB ranking: 93 ▲13 (1 October 2026)

Uniforms
Home	Away

Asian Championship
- Appearances: 12 (First in 1979)
- Best result: 4th (1987)

The Kuwait men's national volleyball team represents Kuwait in international volleyball competitions and friendly matches. The team is currently ranked 77th in the world.

== Competition record ==
=== Asian Championship ===
Asian Championship record
Year	Round	Position	GP	MW	ML	SW	SL	Squad
(Australia) 1975	Did not participate							
(Bahrain) 1979		7th	0	0	0	0	0	Squad
(Japan) 1983		7th	0	0	0	0	0	Squad
(Kuwait) 1987	Semifinals	4th	0	0	0	0	0	Squad
(South Korea) 1989		5th	0	0	0	0	0	Squad
(Australia) 1991	Did not participate							
(Thailand) 1993		14th	0	0	0	0	0	Squad
(South Korea) 1995		13th	0	0	0	0	0	Squad
(Qatar) 1997	Did not participate							
(Iran) 1999		14th	0	0	0	0	0	Squad
(South Korea) 2001	Did not participate							
(China) 2003	Did not participate							
(Thailand) 2005	Did not participate							
(Indonesia) 2007		17th	0	0	0	0	0	Squad
(Philippines) 2009	Did not participate							
(Iran) 2011	Did not participate							
(United Arab Emirates) 2013		17th	0	0	0	0	0	Squad
(Iran) 2015		14th	0	0	0	0	0	Squad
(Indonesia) 2017	Did not participate							
(Iran) 2019		15th	0	0	0	0	0	Squad
(Japan) 2021		16th	0	0	0	0	0	Squad
(Iran) 2023	Did not participate							
(Japan) 2026	Did not participate							
Total	0 Titles	12/23	0	0	0	0	0	—

=== Asian Games ===
Asian Games record
Year	Round	Position	GP	MW	ML	SW	SL	Squad
(Japan) 1958	Did not participate							
(Indonesia) 1962	Did not participate							
(Thailand) 1966	Did not participate							
(Thailand) 1970	Did not participate							
(Iran) 1974		8th	0	0	0	0	0	Squad
(Thailand) 1978		6th	0	0	0	0	0	Squad
(India) 1982		7th	0	0	0	0	0	Squad
(South Korea) 1986		6th	0	0	0	0	0	Squad
(China) 1990	Did not participate							
(Japan) 1994	Did not participate							
(Thailand) 1998	Did not participate							
(South Korea) 2002	Did not participate							
(Qatar) 2006	Preliminary round	11th	0	0	0	0	0	Squad
(China) 2010	9th–12th places	12th	0	0	0	0	0	Squad
(South Korea) 2014	5th–8th places	8th	0	0	0	0	0	Squad
(Indonesia) 2018	Did not participate							
(China) 2022	Did not participate							
(Japan) 2026	Did not participate							
Total	0 Title	7/18	0	0	0	0	0	—

=== WAVA Championship ===
Champions Runners up Third place Fourth place

WAVA Championship record
Year	Round	Position	GP	MW	ML	SW	SL	Squad
(Bahrain) 2025	5th–8th places	5th	6	3	3	9	11	Squad
(Oman) 2026	Semifinals	4th	4	1	3	4	9	Squad
Total	0 Titles	2/2	10	4	6	13	20	—

=== Arab Volleyball Challenge Cup ===
- (Jordan) 2025 – (bronze)
