= 2019 FIVB Volleyball Boys' U19 World Championship squads =

This article shows the rosters of all participating teams at the Boys' U19 World Championship 2019 in Tunisia.

== Pool A ==
=== Belarus ===
The following is the Belarusian roster in the 2019 FIVB Volleyball Boys' U19 World Championship.

Head Coach: Kavaliou Aliaksei

No.	Name	Date of birth	Height	Weight	Spike	Block	2019 club
3	Artsemi Matyl	26 April 2002	2.03 m (6 ft 8 in)	87 kg (192 lb)	360 cm (140 in)	0 cm (0 in)	(Belarus) SDUSHOR VC Minsk MINSK
4	Hleb Azaranka	3 July 2003	2.06 m (6 ft 9 in)	80 kg (180 lb)	340 cm (130 in)	0 cm (0 in)	(Belarus) RGUOR MINSK
5	Dzmitry Dyleuski	13 March 2001	1.97 m (6 ft 6 in)	80 kg (180 lb)	325 cm (128 in)	0 cm (0 in)	(Belarus) RGUOR MINSK
6	Uladzislau Babkevich	10 May 2001	2.06 m (6 ft 9 in)	82 kg (181 lb)	355 cm (140 in)	0 cm (0 in)	(Belarus) Shakhtior SOLIGORSK
7	Aliaksei Ilkevitch	13 March 2003	1.97 m (6 ft 6 in)	80 kg (180 lb)	325 cm (128 in)	0 cm (0 in)	(Belarus) RGUOR MINSK
8	Andrei Balyka	22 April 2001	1.95 m (6 ft 5 in)	78 kg (172 lb)	330 cm (130 in)	0 cm (0 in)	(Belarus) RGUOR MINSK
9	Anton Sushynski (c)	3 August 2001	1.94 m (6 ft 4 in)	74 kg (163 lb)	335 cm (132 in)	0 cm (0 in)	(Belarus) Energia GOMEL
10	Aliaksandr Piatrevich	9 June 2001	1.95 m (6 ft 5 in)	77 kg (170 lb)	320 cm (130 in)	0 cm (0 in)	(Belarus) RGUOR MINSK
12	Maksim Fralenkou	20 March 2001	1.87 m (6 ft 2 in)	70 kg (150 lb)	325 cm (128 in)	0 cm (0 in)	(Belarus) RGUOR MINSK
17	Uladzimir Halota	7 February 2001	1.88 m (6 ft 2 in)	75 kg (165 lb)	320 cm (130 in)	0 cm (0 in)	(Belarus) Energia GOMEL
18	Ilya Marozau	12 May 2002	1.95 m (6 ft 5 in)	82 kg (181 lb)	320 cm (130 in)	0 cm (0 in)	(Belarus) SDUSHOR VC Minsk MINSK
19	Mikita Zamorski	29 March 2001	1.94 m (6 ft 4 in)	75 kg (165 lb)	330 cm (130 in)	0 cm (0 in)	(Belarus) RGUOR MINSK
20	Yauheni Hretski	28 August 2001	1.91 m (6 ft 3 in)	71 kg (157 lb)	325 cm (128 in)	0 cm (0 in)	(Belarus) Shakhtior SOLIGORSK
21	Uladzislau Davyskiba	31 March 2001	1.97 m (6 ft 6 in)	92 kg (203 lb)	340 cm (130 in)	0 cm (0 in)	(Belarus) Stroitel MINSK
22	Yahor Kavaleu	30 January 2001	1.8 m (5 ft 11 in)	70 kg (150 lb)	275 cm (108 in)	0 cm (0 in)	(Belarus) Energia GOMEL
23	Maksim Bahatka	22 February 2001	1.96 m (6 ft 5 in)	70 kg (150 lb)	321 cm (126 in)	0 cm (0 in)	(Belarus) Shakhtior SOLIGORSk

=== Brazil ===
The following is the Brazilian roster in the 2019 FIVB Volleyball Boys' U19 World Championship.

Head Coach: Fabiano Preturlon Ribeiro

No.	Name	Date of birth	Height	Weight	Spike	Block	2019 club
1	Darlan Ferreira Souza	24 June 2002	1.92 m (6 ft 4 in)	95 kg (209 lb)	358 cm (141 in)	0 cm (0 in)	(Brazil) SESI SP
3	Gustavo André Orlando (c)	10 August 2002	1.89 m (6 ft 2 in)	89 kg (196 lb)	335 cm (132 in)	0 cm (0 in)	(Brazil) Minas Tênis Clube
4	Lucas Lima Donato Da Silva	4 January 2001	1.95 m (6 ft 5 in)	93 kg (205 lb)	330 cm (130 in)	0 cm (0 in)	(Brazil) Campinas Volei Renata
5	Rafael Forster Da Paz	22 February 2002	1.76 m (5 ft 9 in)	66 kg (146 lb)	320 cm (130 in)	0 cm (0 in)	(Brazil) Fluminense Football Club
6	Adriano Fernandes P.X.Cavalcante	6 February 2002	2 m (6 ft 7 in)	75 kg (165 lb)	340 cm (130 in)	0 cm (0 in)	(Brazil) Matheus Leme
7	Paulo Vinicios Ferreira Da Silva	23 August 2001	1.97 m (6 ft 6 in)	102 kg (225 lb)	347 cm (137 in)	0 cm (0 in)	(Brazil) Minas Tênis Clube
9	Nathan Mota Krupp	20 November 2001	1.95 m (6 ft 5 in)	96 kg (212 lb)	335 cm (132 in)	0 cm (0 in)	(Brazil) SESI SP
10	Guilherme Vargas Marques	14 November 2001	1.84 m (6 ft 0 in)	83 kg (183 lb)	315 cm (124 in)	0 cm (0 in)	(Brazil) Sada Cruzeiro
11	Guilherme Rech	5 January 2001	2.02 m (6 ft 8 in)	92 kg (203 lb)	340 cm (130 in)	0 cm (0 in)	(Brazil) Sada Cruzeiro
12	Leonardo Henrique Andrade	14 May 2002	2.06 m (6 ft 9 in)	89 kg (196 lb)	350 cm (140 in)	0 cm (0 in)	(Brazil) SESI SP
13	Matias Provensi	26 March 2001	2.01 m (6 ft 7 in)	95 kg (209 lb)	350 cm (140 in)	0 cm (0 in)	(Brazil) Sada Cruzeiro
14	Maicon Dos Santos França	27 April 2004	2.12 m (6 ft 11 in)	90 kg (200 lb)	343 cm (135 in)	0 cm (0 in)	(Brazil) Fluminense Football Club
15	Pedro Henrique Tomasi	12 January 2001	1.76 m (5 ft 9 in)	69 kg (152 lb)	290 cm (110 in)	0 cm (0 in)	(Brazil) SADA CRUZEIRO
16	Otávio Filipi Brasil	24 July 2001	2.02 m (6 ft 8 in)	92 kg (203 lb)	335 cm (132 in)	0 cm (0 in)	(Brazil) Minas Tênis Clube
18	Leandro Campos De Oliveira Junior	9 February 2001	1.94 m (6 ft 4 in)	83 kg (183 lb)	348 cm (137 in)	0 cm (0 in)	(Brazil) Campinas Volei Renata
20	Felipe Caputi Varela	27 February 2002	1.9 m (6 ft 3 in)	95 kg (209 lb)	335 cm (132 in)	0 cm (0 in)	(Brazil) Fluminense Football Clu

=== Chinese Taipei ===
The following is the Chinese Taipei roster in the 2019 FIVB Volleyball Boys' U19 World Championship.

Head Coach: Teng-Chi Wang

No.	Name	Date of birth	Height	Weight	Spike	Block
1	Rayshon Nehemiah Jackman	30 March 2002	1.78 m (5 ft 10 in)	68 kg (150 lb)	310 cm (120 in)	0 cm (0 in)
2	Jia-Ming Guo	26 January 2001	1.82 m (6 ft 0 in)	90 kg (200 lb)	305 cm (120 in)	
5	Mao-Tsung Tseng	20 March 2002	1.88 m (6 ft 2 in)	75 kg (165 lb)	305 cm (120 in)	0 cm (0 in)
8	Kuan-Yu Chou	21 April 2001	1.83 m (6 ft 0 in)	70 kg (150 lb)	308 cm (121 in)	0 cm (0 in)
9	Pei-Chang Tsai	2 January 2001	2 m (6 ft 7 in)	92 kg (203 lb)	325 cm (128 in)	0 cm (0 in)
10	Yu-Chen Chang	22 May 2002	1.86 m (6 ft 1 in)	75 kg (165 lb)	295 cm (116 in)	0 cm (0 in)
12	No Lei	29 October 2002	1.94 m (6 ft 4 in)	80 kg (180 lb)	310 cm (120 in)	0 cm (0 in)
13	Hsiang-Ming Tseng	16 February 2002	1.92 m (6 ft 4 in)	70 kg (150 lb)	320 cm (130 in)	0 cm (0 in)
14	Hung-Yeh Chang	21 January 2001	1.9 m (6 ft 3 in)	87 kg (192 lb)	315 cm (124 in)	0 cm (0 in)
17	Liang-Sheng Yu	8 October 2001	1.88 m (6 ft 2 in)	65 kg (143 lb)	310 cm (120 in)	0 cm (0 in)
19	Po-Kai Chang (c)	26 February 2001	1.82 m (6 ft 0 in)	68 kg (150 lb)	300 cm (120 in)	0 cm (0 in)
20	Po-Jui Huang	30 June 2001	1.75 m (5 ft 9 in)	70 kg (150 lb)	260 cm (100 in)	0 cm (0 in)

=== Cuba ===
The following is the Cuban roster in the 2019 FIVB Volleyball Boys' U19 World Championship.

Head Coach: Mario Raul Izquierdo Perez

No.	Name	Date of birth	Height	Weight	Spike	Block	2019 club
1	Jose Miguel Gutierrez Suarez	27 October 2001	1.92 m (6 ft 4 in)	73 kg (161 lb)	329 cm (130 in)	0 cm (0 in)	(Cuba) Villa Clara
2	Christian Manuel Thondike Mejias	28 May 2001	1.95 m (6 ft 5 in)	76 kg (168 lb)	340 cm (130 in)	0 cm (0 in)	(Cuba) La Habana
4	Marlon Yant Herrera	23 May 2001	2.02 m (6 ft 8 in)	75 kg (165 lb)	345 cm (136 in)	0 cm (0 in)	(Cuba) Villa Clara
6	Adrian Chirino Callam	26 March 2002	1.94 m (6 ft 4 in)	84 kg (185 lb)	329 cm (130 in)	0 cm (0 in)	(Cuba) Camaguey
7	Ricardo Gomez Alonso	1 April 2001	2.02 m (6 ft 8 in)	78 kg (172 lb)	350 cm (140 in)	0 cm (0 in)	(Cuba) Mayabeque
10	Gustavo Bolaños Vera	31 January 2002	1.97 m (6 ft 6 in)	78 kg (172 lb)	350 cm (140 in)	0 cm (0 in)	(Cuba) Cienfuegos
11	Reynier Ibar Menendez	9 March 2001	1.99 m (6 ft 6 in)	90 kg (200 lb)	345 cm (136 in)	0 cm (0 in)	(Cuba) La Habana
12	Alejandro Miguel Gonzalez Rodriguez	12 March 2003	2 m (6 ft 7 in)	85 kg (187 lb)	345 cm (136 in)	0 cm (0 in)	(Cuba) Matanzas
13	Brayan Francisco Valle Garcia	28 September 2003	2 m (6 ft 7 in)	90 kg (200 lb)	345 cm (136 in)	0 cm (0 in)	(Cuba) Santic Spiritus
14	Luis Vidal Allen Serrano	2 May 2001	1.95 m (6 ft 5 in)	67 kg (148 lb)	350 cm (140 in)	0 cm (0 in)	(Cuba) La Habana
16	Alexei Ramirez Masso (c)	21 June 2001	1.94 m (6 ft 4 in)	76 kg (168 lb)	340 cm (130 in)	0 cm (0 in)	(Cuba) La Habana
19	Victor Ramon Andreu Flores	31 August 2001	1.88 m (6 ft 2 in)	72 kg (159 lb)	345 cm (136 in)	0 cm (0 in)	(Cuba) Camaguey
20	Eduardo Sergio Hernandez Hernandez	14 February 2001	1.9 m (6 ft 3 in)	71 kg (157 lb)	343 cm (135 in)	0 cm (0 in)	(Cuba) La Haban

=== Tunisia ===
The following is the Tunisian roster in the 2019 FIVB Volleyball Boys' U19 World Championship.

Head Coach: Ameur Nasraoui

No.	Name	Date of birth	Height	Weight	Spike	Block	2019 club
1	Achref Ben Brahim	17 July 2002	1.84 m (6 ft 0 in)	89 kg (196 lb)	310 cm (120 in)	0 cm (0 in)	(Tunisia) Z.sport
2	Adem Elmeddeb	1 April 2003	1.85 m (6 ft 1 in)	76 kg (168 lb)	315 cm (124 in)	0 cm (0 in)	(Tunisia) F.H.Ghezaz
3	Seifeddine Aidi	3 January 2001	2 m (6 ft 7 in)	85 kg (187 lb)	330 cm (130 in)	0 cm (0 in)	(Tunisia) U.S.T.Sfax
4	Mohamed Ali Darouazi	4 June 2002	1.88 m (6 ft 2 in)	74 kg (163 lb)	312 cm (123 in)	0 cm (0 in)	(Tunisia) U.S.T.Sfax
5	Mohamed Ben Khlifa	1 January 2001	1.88 m (6 ft 2 in)	88 kg (194 lb)	312 cm (123 in)	0 cm (0 in)	(Tunisia) U.S.T.Sfax
6	Mohamed Amin Ouertani	17 June 2002	1.95 m (6 ft 5 in)	70 kg (150 lb)	304 cm (120 in)	0 cm (0 in)	(Tunisia) C.S.Sfax
7	Omar Ksida	12 June 2003	1.91 m (6 ft 3 in)	67 kg (148 lb)	325 cm (128 in)	0 cm (0 in)	(Tunisia) C.O.Kelibia
8	Achraf Alimi	22 December 2001	1.85 m (6 ft 1 in)	88 kg (194 lb)	312 cm (123 in)	0 cm (0 in)	(Tunisia) C.S.Sfax
9	Mouaouia Ben Romdane	16 January 2001	2 m (6 ft 7 in)	82 kg (181 lb)	335 cm (132 in)	0 cm (0 in)	(Tunisia) C.O.Kelibia
10	Elyes Bouachir C	27 October 2001	1.96 m (6 ft 5 in)	85 kg (187 lb)	348 cm (137 in)	0 cm (0 in)	(Tunisia) S.S.B.Said
11	Marouan Belhaj Salah	22 November 2001	1.99 m (6 ft 6 in)	84 kg (185 lb)	330 cm (130 in)	0 cm (0 in)	(Tunisia) C.O.Kelibia
12	Salem Ben Hlima	2 September 2001	1.96 m (6 ft 5 in)	92 kg (203 lb)	340 cm (130 in)	0 cm (0 in)	(Tunisia) C.S.Sfax
13	Oussema Ben Ghazi	27 May 2001	1.89 m (6 ft 2 in)	73 kg (161 lb)	315 cm (124 in)	0 cm (0 in)	(Tunisia) C.o.Kelibia
14	Khaled Bouallegue	7 November 2003	1.94 m (6 ft 4 in)	70 kg (150 lb)	325 cm (128 in)	0 cm (0 in)	(Tunisia) E.S.Tunis
15	Mohamed Jebali	25 September 2001	1.96 m (6 ft 5 in)	76 kg (168 lb)	315 cm (124 in)	0 cm (0 in)	(Tunisia) S.S.B.Said
16	Soufien Kharrat	6 January 2001	1.78 m (5 ft 10 in)	74 kg (163 lb)	298 cm (117 in)	0 cm (0 in)	(Tunisia) U.S.T.Sfax
17	Mohamed Amine Trabelsi	7 June 2002	1.96 m (6 ft 5 in)	73 kg (161 lb)	323 cm (127 in)	0 cm (0 in)	(Tunisia) U.S.Carthage
18	Sabri Krid	25 January 2002	1.84 m (6 ft 0 in)	79 kg (174 lb)	307 cm (121 in)	0 cm (0 in)	(Tunisia) B.B.Sportif
19	Aymen Bouguerra	1 November 2001	1.88 m (6 ft 2 in)	70 kg (150 lb)	325 cm (128 in)	0 cm (0 in)	(Tunisia) E S Tunis
20	Heithem Bahri	1 August 2003	1.88 m (6 ft 2 in)	88 kg (194 lb)	312 cm (123 in)	0 cm (0 in)	(Tunisia) E.S.Tuni

== Pool B ==
=== Bulgaria ===
The following is the Bulgarian roster in the 2019 FIVB Volleyball Boys' U19 World Championship.

Head Coach: Plamen Hristov

No.	Name	Date of birth	Height	Weight	Spike	Block	2019 club
1	Martin Yurukov	19 April 2002	2.03 m (6 ft 8 in)	81 kg (179 lb)	325 cm (128 in)	0 cm (0 in)	(Bulgaria) Pirin Razlog
2	Samuil Valchinov	21 December 2001	1.94 m (6 ft 4 in)	77 kg (170 lb)	330 cm (130 in)	0 cm (0 in)	(Bulgaria) Levski Sofia
3	Denis Karyagin (c)	28 September 2002	2.02 m (6 ft 8 in)	84 kg (185 lb)	330 cm (130 in)	0 cm (0 in)	(Bulgaria) Neftohimik 2010
4	Nikolay Zahariev	18 March 2001	2.03 m (6 ft 8 in)	75 kg (165 lb)	335 cm (132 in)	0 cm (0 in)	(Bulgaria) Slavia
5	Simeon Dobrev	15 April 2001	1.65 m (5 ft 5 in)	58 kg (128 lb)	280 cm (110 in)	0 cm (0 in)	(Bulgaria) Dunav Ruse
6	Samuil Vasilev	7 June 2002	1.78 m (5 ft 10 in)	73 kg (161 lb)	300 cm (120 in)	0 cm (0 in)	(Bulgaria) Dobrudzha 07
7	Zhelyazko Apostolov	26 February 2001	1.98 m (6 ft 6 in)	82 kg (181 lb)	344 cm (135 in)	0 cm (0 in)	(Bulgaria) Victoria
8	Lyuboslav Telkiyski	24 August 2001	1.97 m (6 ft 6 in)	73 kg (161 lb)	320 cm (130 in)	0 cm (0 in)	(Bulgaria) Pirin Razlog
9	Andrey Hristov	27 March 2001	2.01 m (6 ft 7 in)	75 kg (165 lb)	325 cm (128 in)	0 cm (0 in)	(Bulgaria) CSKA
10	Petar Petrov	29 January 2001	1.91 m (6 ft 3 in)	67 kg (148 lb)	330 cm (130 in)	0 cm (0 in)	(Bulgaria) Pirin Razlog
11	Rusi Zhelev	21 December 2001	2 m (6 ft 7 in)	81 kg (179 lb)	330 cm (130 in)	0 cm (0 in)	(Bulgaria) Beroe
12	Miroslav Dimitrov	19 June 2001	2.03 m (6 ft 8 in)	83 kg (183 lb)	341 cm (134 in)	0 cm (0 in)	(Bulgaria) Pirin Razlog
13	Borislav Nikolov	7 June 2003	1.92 m (6 ft 4 in)	74 kg (163 lb)	315 cm (124 in)	0 cm (0 in)	(Bulgaria) Slavia
14	Damyan Kolev	11 January 2002	1.78 m (5 ft 10 in)	68 kg (150 lb)	295 cm (116 in)	0 cm (0 in)	(Bulgaria) Dobrudzha 07
15	Teodor Yordanov	24 April 2002	1.97 m (6 ft 6 in)	69 kg (152 lb)	325 cm (128 in)	0 cm (0 in)	(Bulgaria) Dobrudzha 07
16	Bozhidar Georgiev	28 July 2001	1.92 m (6 ft 4 in)	80 kg (180 lb)	320 cm (130 in)	0 cm (0 in)	(Bulgaria) vICTORIA vOLLEY
17	Todor Dimitrov	6 April 2001	1.93 m (6 ft 4 in)	69 kg (152 lb)	325 cm (128 in)	0 cm (0 in)	(Bulgaria) Pirin Razlog
18	Vladimir Garkov	2 October 2003	1.96 m (6 ft 5 in)	79 kg (174 lb)	325 cm (128 in)	0 cm (0 in)	(Bulgaria) Victoria Volley
19	Lubcho Yankov	27 December 2001	2.03 m (6 ft 8 in)	95 kg (209 lb)	335 cm (132 in)	0 cm (0 in)	(Bulgaria) Marek Union Ivkoni
20	Georgi Tatarov	10 May 2003	1.95 m (6 ft 5 in)	69 kg (152 lb)	340 cm (130 in)	0 cm (0 in)	(Bulgaria) CSK

=== Colombia ===
The following is the Colombian roster in the 2019 FIVB Volleyball Boys' U19 World Championship.

Head Coach: Carlos Felipe Osorio Arboleda

No.	Name	Date of birth	Height	Weight	Spike	Block	2019 club
1	Cristian David Murillo Garcia	7 July 2001	2.01 m (6 ft 7 in)	80 kg (180 lb)	350 cm (140 in)	0 cm (0 in)	(Colombia) Liga Vallecaucana
2	Luis Daniel Lopez Ramirez	21 July 2002	1.95 m (6 ft 5 in)	76 kg (168 lb)	340 cm (130 in)	0 cm (0 in)	(Colombia) Liga Vallecaucana
3	Andres Felipe Guzman Gutierrez	27 July 2001	1.92 m (6 ft 4 in)	75 kg (165 lb)	325 cm (128 in)	0 cm (0 in)	(Colombia) Liga Bogota
5	Ronnie S Mosquera Galvis	29 January 2003	1.9 m (6 ft 3 in)	74 kg (163 lb)	335 cm (132 in)	0 cm (0 in)	(Colombia) Liga Vallecaucana
6	Luis Miguel Rincon	24 February 2001	1.77 m (5 ft 10 in)	70 kg (150 lb)	312 cm (123 in)	0 cm (0 in)	(Colombia) Liga Risaraldense
7	Leiner Aponza Carabali	27 August 2001	1.98 m (6 ft 6 in)	76 kg (168 lb)	352 cm (139 in)	0 cm (0 in)	(Colombia) Liga Vallecaucana
8	Andres Antonio Osorio Osorio	11 October 2003	2.02 m (6 ft 8 in)	71 kg (157 lb)	320 cm (130 in)	0 cm (0 in)	(Colombia) Liga Atlantico
9	Jharold Caicedo (c)	3 September 2001	1.91 m (6 ft 3 in)	70 kg (150 lb)	330 cm (130 in)	0 cm (0 in)	(Colombia) Liga Vallecaucana
10	Santiago Andres Ruiz Alvarez	27 March 2002	1.89 m (6 ft 2 in)	70 kg (150 lb)	331 cm (130 in)	0 cm (0 in)	(Colombia) Liga Antioqueña
11	Mario Alejandro Florez Duarte	8 May 2004	1.9 m (6 ft 3 in)	75 kg (165 lb)	320 cm (130 in)	0 cm (0 in)	(Colombia) Liga Meta
12	Joan Steven Murillo Valdes	4 September 2002	1.89 m (6 ft 2 in)	90 kg (200 lb)	322 cm (127 in)	0 cm (0 in)	(Colombia) Liga Vallecaucana
13	Roosvuelt Riol Ramos Lemos	20 January 2003	1.8 m (5 ft 11 in)	69 kg (152 lb)	322 cm (127 in)	0 cm (0 in)	(Colombia) Liga Vallecaucana
14	Santiago Avila Mendieta	12 September 2002	1.93 m (6 ft 4 in)	78 kg (172 lb)	318 cm (125 in)	0 cm (0 in)	(Colombia) Liga Vallecaucana
15	Tomas Gonzalez Diaz	28 June 2004	1.86 m (6 ft 1 in)	75 kg (165 lb)	315 cm (124 in)	0 cm (0 in)	(Colombia) Liga Bogota
16	Jhon Alexander Viveros Lugo	12 August 2001	1.98 m (6 ft 6 in)	79 kg (174 lb)	347 cm (137 in)	0 cm (0 in)	(Colombia) Liga Vallecaucana
17	Daniel Aponza Carabali	27 August 2001	1.98 m (6 ft 6 in)	76 kg (168 lb)	347 cm (137 in)	0 cm (0 in)	(Colombia) Liga Vallecaucana
18	Jhon Mario Cuello Florez	21 November 2001	1.95 m (6 ft 5 in)	86 kg (190 lb)	341 cm (134 in)	0 cm (0 in)	(Colombia) Liga Bolivarense
19	Miguel Angel Martinez Palacios	23 October 2003	1.93 m (6 ft 4 in)	78 kg (172 lb)	0 cm (0 in)	0 cm (0 in)	(Colombia) Liga Antioqueña
20	Samuel Jaramillo Puerta	27 December 2002	1.84 m (6 ft 0 in)	72 kg (159 lb)	305 cm (120 in)	0 cm (0 in)	(Colombia) Liga Antioqueña

=== Czech Republic ===
The following is the Czech roster in the 2019 FIVB Volleyball Boys' U19 World Championship.

Head Coach: Jindrich Licek

No.	Name	Date of birth	Height	Weight	Spike	Block	2019 club
3	Petr Spulak	1 May 2002	1.99 m (6 ft 6 in)	85 kg (187 lb)	350 cm (140 in)	0 cm (0 in)	(Czech Republic) VK Lvi Praha
4	Matyas Dzavoronok	5 September 2001	1.98 m (6 ft 6 in)	87 kg (192 lb)	338 cm (133 in)	0 cm (0 in)	(Czech Republic) VK Karlovarsko
5	Radim Zavodsky	24 August 2001	1.98 m (6 ft 6 in)	89 kg (196 lb)	340 cm (130 in)	0 cm (0 in)	(Czech Republic) VK Ostrava
6	Ondrej Unzeitig	23 July 2001	1.94 m (6 ft 4 in)	78 kg (172 lb)	338 cm (133 in)	0 cm (0 in)	(Czech Republic) VK Ostrava
7	Radek Balaz (c)	7 May 2001	2.02 m (6 ft 8 in)	89 kg (196 lb)	348 cm (137 in)	0 cm (0 in)	(Czech Republic) VK Karlovarsko
10	Jiri Mikulenka	14 June 2001	1.93 m (6 ft 4 in)	80 kg (180 lb)	339 cm (133 in)	0 cm (0 in)	(Czech Republic) VK Pribram
11	Matous Drahonovsky	7 May 2001	1.94 m (6 ft 4 in)	80 kg (180 lb)	338 cm (133 in)	0 cm (0 in)	(Czech Republic) VK Dukla Liberec
12	Ladislav Toman	18 April 2001	1.96 m (6 ft 5 in)	80 kg (180 lb)	338 cm (133 in)	0 cm (0 in)	(Czech Republic) VK Lvi Praha
13	Jan Vodicka	26 July 2001	2.02 m (6 ft 8 in)	79 kg (174 lb)	339 cm (133 in)	0 cm (0 in)	(Czech Republic) VK Lvi Praha
15	Tomas Kristian	24 April 2001	2.01 m (6 ft 7 in)	80 kg (180 lb)	338 cm (133 in)	0 cm (0 in)	(Czech Republic) VK Ostrava
17	Lukas Ceketa	21 March 2001	1.94 m (6 ft 4 in)	79 kg (174 lb)	342 cm (135 in)	0 cm (0 in)	(Czech Republic) Volejbal Brno
20	Daniel Rosenbaum	23 September 2002	1.91 m (6 ft 3 in)	75 kg (165 lb)	330 cm (130 in)	0 cm (0 in)	(Czech Republic) VK Pribram
21	Matej Salek	16 January 2003	1.8 m (5 ft 11 in)	73 kg (161 lb)	315 cm (124 in)	0 cm (0 in)	(Czech Republic) VK Pribram

=== Iran ===
The following is the Iranian roster in the 2019 FIVB Volleyball Boys' U19 World Championship.

Head Coach: Mohammad Vakili

No.	Name	Date of birth	Height	Weight	Spike	Block	2019 club
1	Amir Reza Sarlak	10 May 2001	2.01 m (6 ft 7 in)	86 kg (190 lb)	350 cm (140 in)	325 cm (128 in)	(Iran) Dorna Urmia
2	Mahdi Jelveh	21 May 2001	2.08 m (6 ft 10 in)	85 kg (187 lb)	355 cm (140 in)	330 cm (130 in)	(Iran) Dorna Urmia
4	Ali Asghar Nabizadeh Gheshlagh Khanjar	21 June 2001	1.93 m (6 ft 4 in)	94 kg (207 lb)	330 cm (130 in)	312 cm (123 in)	(Iran) Dorna Urmia
5	Amir Hossein Toukhteh	9 April 2001	2.03 m (6 ft 8 in)	79 kg (174 lb)	360 cm (140 in)	330 cm (130 in)	(Iran) Saipa Tehran
6	Bardia Saadat	12 August 2002	2.05 m (6 ft 9 in)	87 kg (192 lb)	355 cm (140 in)	328 cm (129 in)	(Iran) Dorna Urmia
7	Abdolmokhtar Boush	2 February 2001	1.89 m (6 ft 2 in)	75 kg (165 lb)	326 cm (128 in)	310 cm (120 in)	(Iran) Shahrdari Gonbad
9	Mehran Feyz (c)	23 November 2001	2.05 m (6 ft 9 in)	77 kg (170 lb)	350 cm (140 in)	325 cm (128 in)	(Iran) Kalleh Mazandaran
11	Soheil Kamalabadi	14 January 2001	1.98 m (6 ft 6 in)	81 kg (179 lb)	340 cm (130 in)	320 cm (130 in)	(Iran) Dorna Urmia
12	Amirhossein Khani Garkoroudi	8 July 2001	2.02 m (6 ft 8 in)	83 kg (183 lb)	346 cm (136 in)	330 cm (130 in)	(Iran) Dorna Urmia
13	Amin Khajeh Khalili	28 March 2001	1.94 m (6 ft 4 in)	85 kg (187 lb)	342 cm (135 in)	330 cm (130 in)	(Iran) Dorna Urmia
16	Soheil Masoud	14 February 2001	1.87 m (6 ft 2 in)	68 kg (150 lb)	320 cm (130 in)	300 cm (120 in)	(Iran) Dorna Urmia
19	Sajad Jelodarian Maman	19 January 2003	1.78 m (5 ft 10 in)	72 kg (159 lb)	290 cm (110 in)	265 cm (104 in)	(Iran) Paykan Tehran

=== Italy ===
The following is the Italian roster in the 2019 FIVB Volleyball Boys' U19 World Championship.

Head Coach: Vincenzo Fanizza

No.	Name	Date of birth	Height	Weight	Spike	Block	2019 club
1	Damiano Catania	28 March 2001	1.76 m (5 ft 9 in)	72 kg (159 lb)	319 cm (126 in)	0 cm (0 in)	(Italy) Materdomini C. Grotte
2	Leonardo Ferrato	25 December 2001	1.96 m (6 ft 5 in)	89 kg (196 lb)	347 cm (137 in)	0 cm (0 in)	(Italy) Pallavolo Padova
4	Federico Crosato	22 May 2002	2 m (6 ft 7 in)	80 kg (180 lb)	353 cm (139 in)	0 cm (0 in)	(Italy) Treviso Volley
5	Alessandro Michieletto	5 December 2001	2.05 m (6 ft 9 in)	88 kg (194 lb)	357 cm (141 in)	0 cm (0 in)	(Italy) Trentino Volley
7	Piervito Disabato (c)	11 February 2001	1.9 m (6 ft 3 in)	86 kg (190 lb)	329 cm (130 in)	0 cm (0 in)	(Italy) Materdomini C. Grotte
8	Alberto Pol	4 March 2001	1.98 m (6 ft 6 in)	92 kg (203 lb)	352 cm (139 in)	0 cm (0 in)	(Italy) Treviso Volley
9	Tommaso Stefani	4 May 2001	2.12 m (6 ft 11 in)	102 kg (225 lb)	360 cm (140 in)	0 cm (0 in)	(Italy) Sestese Volley
10	Alessandro Gianotti	21 October 2001	1.99 m (6 ft 6 in)	90 kg (200 lb)	341 cm (134 in)	0 cm (0 in)	(Italy) Vero Volley Monza
14	Giulio Magalini	14 August 2001	1.96 m (6 ft 5 in)	86 kg (190 lb)	350 cm (140 in)	0 cm (0 in)	(Italy) Blue Volley Verona
15	Tommaso Rinaldi	9 November 2001	2 m (6 ft 7 in)	82 kg (181 lb)	350 cm (140 in)	0 cm (0 in)	(Italy) Modena Volley
16	Paolo Porro	27 October 2001	1.83 m (6 ft 0 in)	64 kg (141 lb)	333 cm (131 in)	0 cm (0 in)	(Italy) Treviso Volley
18	Nicola Cianciotta	8 April 2001	1.96 m (6 ft 5 in)	84 kg (185 lb)	342 cm (135 in)	0 cm (0 in)	(Italy) Materdomini C. Grotte

== Pool C ==
=== Argentina ===
The following is the Argentinian roster in the 2019 FIVB Volleyball Boys' U19 World Championship.

Head Coach: Pablo Rico

No.	Name	Date of birth	Height	Weight	Spike	Block	2019 club
1	Gonzalo Diaspro	29 January 2001	1.9 m (6 ft 3 in)	86 kg (190 lb)	334 cm (131 in)	0 cm (0 in)	(Argentina) VELEZ
2	Ramses Cascu	27 September 2001	1.91 m (6 ft 3 in)	65 kg (143 lb)	342 cm (135 in)	0 cm (0 in)	(Argentina) CAMPANA
3	Agustin Nogueira	18 February 2002	1.92 m (6 ft 4 in)	105 kg (231 lb)	339 cm (133 in)	0 cm (0 in)	(Argentina) CLUB CIUDAD DE BUENOS AIRES
4	Lorenzo Nieto	23 October 2002	1.93 m (6 ft 4 in)	85 kg (187 lb)	323 cm (127 in)	0 cm (0 in)	(Argentina) CLUB CIUDAD DE BUENOS AIRES
5	Wilson Acosta	28 February 2001	1.88 m (6 ft 2 in)	77 kg (170 lb)	345 cm (136 in)	0 cm (0 in)	(Argentina) DEFENSORES DE BANFIELD
6	Luciano Aloisi	18 October 2002	1.85 m (6 ft 1 in)	67 kg (148 lb)	324 cm (128 in)	0 cm (0 in)	(Argentina) CIUDAD DE BUENOS AIRES
7	Lucas Ibazeta	19 September 2002	1.82 m (6 ft 0 in)	83 kg (183 lb)	339 cm (133 in)	0 cm (0 in)	(Argentina) UPCN
8	Tobias Scarpa	20 October 2001	1.8 m (5 ft 11 in)	73 kg (161 lb)	320 cm (130 in)	0 cm (0 in)	(Argentina) CIUDAD DE BUENOS AIRES
9	Manuel Armoa	1 December 2002	1.95 m (6 ft 5 in)	88 kg (194 lb)	336 cm (132 in)	0 cm (0 in)	(Argentina) UPCN
10	Tomas Capogrosso	8 September 2002	1.94 m (6 ft 4 in)	77 kg (170 lb)	339 cm (133 in)	0 cm (0 in)	(Argentina) SONDER
11	Nazareno Luna	27 June 2002	2.02 m (6 ft 8 in)	76 kg (168 lb)	339 cm (133 in)	0 cm (0 in)	(Argentina) RIVADAVIA
12	Sergio Acosta	10 October 2002	1.94 m (6 ft 4 in)	105 kg (231 lb)	336 cm (132 in)	0 cm (0 in)	(Argentina) LOMAS VOLLEY
13	Agustin Gallardo	1 March 2001	1.95 m (6 ft 5 in)	80 kg (180 lb)	345 cm (136 in)	0 cm (0 in)	(Argentina) LOMAS VOLLEY
14	Valentino Vidoni	14 June 2001	1.96 m (6 ft 5 in)	85 kg (187 lb)	348 cm (137 in)	0 cm (0 in)	(Argentina) CLUB CIUDAD DE BUENOS AIRES
15	Pablo Urchevich (c)	30 April 2001	1.78 m (5 ft 10 in)	70 kg (150 lb)	322 cm (127 in)	0 cm (0 in)	(Argentina) Lomas Voley
16	Gonzalo Pereyra	11 July 2001	1.82 m (6 ft 0 in)	75 kg (165 lb)	330 cm (130 in)	0 cm (0 in)	(Argentina) MITRE
17	Rodrigo Soria	6 August 2001	1.91 m (6 ft 3 in)	85 kg (187 lb)	345 cm (136 in)	0 cm (0 in)	(Argentina) CLUB CIUDAD DE BUENOS AIRES
18	Nahuel Rojas	28 November 2003	1.89 m (6 ft 2 in)	88 kg (194 lb)	339 cm (133 in)	0 cm (0 in)	(Argentina) REGATAS
19	Marcos Richards	29 November 2002	1.85 m (6 ft 1 in)	82 kg (181 lb)	330 cm (130 in)	0 cm (0 in)	(Argentina) HURACAN NECOCHEA
20	Eugenio Gaiottino Aciar	24 February 2003	1.88 m (6 ft 2 in)	76 kg (168 lb)	330 cm (130 in)	0 cm (0 in)	(Argentina) CLUB CIUDAD DE BUENOS AIRES

=== Egypt ===
The following is the Egyptian roster in the 2019 FIVB Volleyball Boys' U19 World Championship.

Head Coach: Hassan Elhossary

No.	Name	Date of birth	Height	Weight	Spike	Block	2019 club
1	Mohamed Elwan	1 January 2001	1.87 m (6 ft 2 in)	72 kg (159 lb)	299 cm (118 in)	0 cm (0 in)	(Egypt) DAMANHOUR
2	Youssef Hussein	26 September 2001	1.95 m (6 ft 5 in)	98 kg (216 lb)	321 cm (126 in)	0 cm (0 in)	(Egypt) SPORTING
3	Omar Deigham	13 September 2001	2 m (6 ft 7 in)	80 kg (180 lb)	335 cm (132 in)	0 cm (0 in)	(Egypt) AL AHLY SC
4	Mohamed Soliman	23 June 2001	1.9 m (6 ft 3 in)	70 kg (150 lb)	311 cm (122 in)	0 cm (0 in)	(Egypt) AL AHLY SC
5	Ahmed Abdelazim	27 July 2001	1.99 m (6 ft 6 in)	98 kg (216 lb)	326 cm (128 in)	0 cm (0 in)	(Egypt) PETROJET
6	Ahmed Abbas	1 September 2001	1.77 m (5 ft 10 in)	66 kg (146 lb)	304 cm (120 in)	0 cm (0 in)	(Egypt) AL AHLY SC
7	Marawan Elnaggar	1 January 2001	1.94 m (6 ft 4 in)	89 kg (196 lb)	341 cm (134 in)	0 cm (0 in)	(Egypt) AL AHLY SC
8	Abdelrahman Elhossiny Eissa (c)	24 August 2001	1.86 m (6 ft 1 in)	78 kg (172 lb)	315 cm (124 in)	0 cm (0 in)	(Egypt) AL AHLY SC
9	Yousef Elantably	5 June 2001	1.92 m (6 ft 4 in)	78 kg (172 lb)	332 cm (131 in)	0 cm (0 in)	(Egypt) EL GAISH SC
10	Anas Mohamed	2 May 2001	1.82 m (6 ft 0 in)	79 kg (174 lb)	302 cm (119 in)	0 cm (0 in)	(Egypt) AL AHLY SC
11	Ahmed Abdou	26 April 2001	1.95 m (6 ft 5 in)	97 kg (214 lb)	315 cm (124 in)	0 cm (0 in)	(Egypt) PETROJET
12	Mahmoud Osman	7 April 2001	1.93 m (6 ft 4 in)	88 kg (194 lb)	308 cm (121 in)	0 cm (0 in)	(Egypt) SMOUHA
13	Adham Argan	1 September 2001	1.84 m (6 ft 0 in)	85 kg (187 lb)	297 cm (117 in)	0 cm (0 in)	(Egypt) AL AHLY SC
14	Karim Ibrahim	5 September 2002	1.95 m (6 ft 5 in)	75 kg (165 lb)	309 cm (122 in)	0 cm (0 in)	(Egypt) AVIATION
15	Eyad Mohamed	17 October 2002	1.92 m (6 ft 4 in)	72 kg (159 lb)	308 cm (121 in)	0 cm (0 in)	(Egypt) AL AHLY SC
16	Ahmed Hanfy	16 August 2001	1.82 m (6 ft 0 in)	84 kg (185 lb)	297 cm (117 in)	0 cm (0 in)	(Egypt) AVIATION
17	Mohamed Eloraby	30 May 2002	2.02 m (6 ft 8 in)	109 kg (240 lb)	330 cm (130 in)	0 cm (0 in)	(Egypt) EL GAISH SC
18	Yossef Noser	17 March 2002	2.02 m (6 ft 8 in)	103 kg (227 lb)	322 cm (127 in)	0 cm (0 in)	(Egypt) WADI DEGLA SC
19	Youssef Gafer	14 July 2001	1.89 m (6 ft 2 in)	83 kg (183 lb)	301 cm (119 in)	0 cm (0 in)	(Egypt) SHOOTING
20	Ibrahim Raslan	19 February 2002	1.67 m (5 ft 6 in)	64 kg (141 lb)	276 cm (109 in)	0 cm (0 in)	(Egypt) AL AHLY SC

=== Germany ===
The following is the German roster in the 2019 FIVB Volleyball Boys' U19 World Championship.

Head Coach: Matus Kalny

No.	Name	Date of birth	Height	Weight	Spike	Block	2019 club
1	Simon Pfretzschner	6 February 2002	1.89 m (6 ft 2 in)	78 kg (172 lb)	316 cm (124 in)	0 cm (0 in)	(Germany) VCO Berlin/ASV Dachau
2	Jason Lieb	28 May 2001	1.92 m (6 ft 4 in)	82 kg (181 lb)	310 cm (120 in)	0 cm (0 in)	(Germany) VI Frankfurt/TV Mömmlingen
3	Benedikt Gerken	4 February 2001	1.95 m (6 ft 5 in)	88 kg (194 lb)	312 cm (123 in)	0 cm (0 in)	(Germany) VCO Berlin/TV Baden
4	Linus Engelmann	1 February 2002	1.86 m (6 ft 1 in)	79 kg (174 lb)	311 cm (122 in)	0 cm (0 in)	(Germany) YS Friedrichshafen/USC Konstan
5	Tobias Hosch	5 March 2001	1.84 m (6 ft 0 in)	78 kg (172 lb)	310 cm (120 in)	0 cm (0 in)	(Germany) YS/VfB Friedrichshafen
6	Ben Stoverink	6 April 2001	1.95 m (6 ft 5 in)	81 kg (179 lb)	318 cm (125 in)	0 cm (0 in)	(Germany) VI Frankfurt/TuB Bochholt
7	Max Schulz	25 August 2002	1.94 m (6 ft 4 in)	80 kg (180 lb)	315 cm (124 in)	0 cm (0 in)	(Germany) VCO Berlin/Berliner TSC
8	Maximilian Kersting	28 March 2001	1.96 m (6 ft 5 in)	86 kg (190 lb)	314 cm (124 in)	0 cm (0 in)	(Germany) VCO Berlin/TV Mömmlingen
9	Filip John	1 August 2001	2.02 m (6 ft 8 in)	89 kg (196 lb)	325 cm (128 in)	0 cm (0 in)	(Germany) VCO Berlin/FC Schüttdorf 09
10	Erik Röhrs (c)	24 April 2001	1.94 m (6 ft 4 in)	82 kg (181 lb)	319 cm (126 in)	0 cm (0 in)	(Germany) VCO Berlin/Berliner TSC
11	Simon Valentin Torwie	1 November 2001	2.03 m (6 ft 8 in)	93 kg (205 lb)	321 cm (126 in)	0 cm (0 in)	(Germany) VI Frankfurt/TuS Kriftel
12	Julian Hoyer	18 September 2001	1.92 m (6 ft 4 in)	79 kg (174 lb)	310 cm (120 in)	0 cm (0 in)	(Germany) VCO Berlin/Bremen 1860
13	Moritz Eckardt	15 June 2001	1.83 m (6 ft 0 in)	70 kg (150 lb)	295 cm (116 in)	0 cm (0 in)	(Germany) VCO Berlin/Berliner TSC
14	Maximilian Just	18 November 2002	1.96 m (6 ft 5 in)	82 kg (181 lb)	312 cm (123 in)	0 cm (0 in)	(Germany) VCO Berlin/Berliner TSC
15	Jan Kolakowski	5 May 2001	1.95 m (6 ft 5 in)	89 kg (196 lb)	312 cm (123 in)	0 cm (0 in)	(Germany) SV Schwaig
16	Philipp Lauter	31 July 2001	1.94 m (6 ft 4 in)	79 kg (174 lb)	309 cm (122 in)	0 cm (0 in)	(Germany) TG Rüsselsheim/ E. Wiesbaden
17	Jan Breburda	9 February 2001	1.96 m (6 ft 5 in)	90 kg (200 lb)	325 cm (128 in)	0 cm (0 in)	(Germany) VI Frankfurt/TuS Kriftel
18	Anselm Rein	1 November 2001	1.89 m (6 ft 2 in)	75 kg (165 lb)	314 cm (124 in)	0 cm (0 in)	(Germany) VC Gotha
19	Melf Urban	28 June 2001	2.03 m (6 ft 8 in)	100 kg (220 lb)	327 cm (129 in)	0 cm (0 in)	(Germany) VI Frankfurt/TSB Flensburg
20	Leon Meier	28 January 2002	2.02 m (6 ft 8 in)	81 kg (179 lb)	326 cm (128 in)	0 cm (0 in)	(Germany) YS Friedrichshafen/TV Büh

=== Japan ===
The following is the Japanese roster in the 2019 FIVB Volleyball Boys' U19 World Championship.

Head Coach: Hiroshi Honda

No.	Name	Date of birth	Height	Weight	Spike	Block	2019 club
1	Yuri Yanakita	20 September 2002	1.91 m (6 ft 3 in)	88 kg (194 lb)	331 cm (130 in)	0 cm (0 in)	(Japan) HIGASHI FUKUOKA High School
2	Daigo Iwamoto (c)	10 February 2001	1.9 m (6 ft 3 in)	82 kg (181 lb)	335 cm (132 in)	0 cm (0 in)	(Japan) WASEDA University
3	Daiki Yamada	7 August 2001	1.89 m (6 ft 2 in)	68 kg (150 lb)	330 cm (130 in)	0 cm (0 in)	(Japan) SHIMIZU SAKURAGAOKA HS
4	Riku Ito	14 November 2001	1.95 m (6 ft 5 in)	100 kg (220 lb)	320 cm (130 in)	0 cm (0 in)	(Japan) SUNDAI GAKUEN High School
5	Masahiro Yamazaki	17 September 2002	1.93 m (6 ft 4 in)	90 kg (200 lb)	333 cm (131 in)	0 cm (0 in)	(Japan) SEIJOH High School
6	Taiga Itoyama	12 January 2001	1.84 m (6 ft 0 in)	64 kg (141 lb)	318 cm (125 in)	0 cm (0 in)	(Japan) FUKUOKA University
7	Akira Sawada	24 April 2002	1.97 m (6 ft 6 in)	85 kg (187 lb)	332 cm (131 in)	0 cm (0 in)	(Japan) AIKODAI MEIDEN High School
8	Fumikazu Morii	30 September 2001	1.77 m (5 ft 10 in)	72 kg (159 lb)	310 cm (120 in)	0 cm (0 in)	(Japan) SUNDAIGAKUEN SENIOR HS
9	Toshiki Wakabayashi	15 August 2001	1.86 m (6 ft 1 in)	73 kg (161 lb)	325 cm (128 in)	0 cm (0 in)	(Japan) OKAYAMA HIGASHI COMMERCIAL HS
10	Tobias Takeshi Shigeto	8 February 2001	1.9 m (6 ft 3 in)	71 kg (157 lb)	330 cm (130 in)	0 cm (0 in)	(Japan) WASEDA University
11	Yujiro Sunagawa	5 December 2001	1.86 m (6 ft 1 in)	73 kg (161 lb)	320 cm (130 in)	0 cm (0 in)	(Japan) SAITAMASAKAE High School
12	Keishiro Takaki	3 September 2001	1.7 m (5 ft 7 in)	58 kg (128 lb)	297 cm (117 in)	0 cm (0 in)	(Japan) SOTOKU High School
13	Kaoru Nakaya	14 August 2001	1.94 m (6 ft 4 in)	84 kg (185 lb)	320 cm (130 in)	0 cm (0 in)	(Japan) FUNABASHI MUNICIPAL HS
14	Koki Wakaizumi	21 October 2001	1.86 m (6 ft 1 in)	73 kg (161 lb)	325 cm (128 in)	0 cm (0 in)	(Japan) FUKUI SENIOR High School
15	Gakuto Hashimoto	20 July 2001	1.77 m (5 ft 10 in)	68 kg (150 lb)	330 cm (130 in)	0 cm (0 in)	(Japan) SAITAMASAKAE High School
16	Naoya Hasegawa	15 January 2002	1.88 m (6 ft 2 in)	70 kg (150 lb)	335 cm (132 in)	0 cm (0 in)	(Japan) AIKODAI MEIDEN High School
17	Koki Enomoto	27 July 2002	1.92 m (6 ft 4 in)	74 kg (163 lb)	320 cm (130 in)	0 cm (0 in)	(Japan) TOKAI UNIVERSITY SAGAMI HS
18	Wataru Komori	30 May 2001	1.78 m (5 ft 10 in)	72 kg (159 lb)	307 cm (121 in)	0 cm (0 in)	(Japan) OMURA TECHNICAL High School
19	Taisei Mori	25 September 2001	1.81 m (5 ft 11 in)	68 kg (150 lb)	315 cm (124 in)	0 cm (0 in)	(Japan) SEIJOH High School

=== Mexico ===
The following is the Mexican roster in the 2019 FIVB Volleyball Boys' U19 World Championship.

Head Coach: Gabriela Isela Alarcón Gómez

No.	Name	Date of birth	Height	Weight	Spike	Block	2019 club
1	Marcos Daniel Jauregui Moran (c)	15 February 2001	1.88 m (6 ft 2 in)	80 kg (180 lb)	310 cm (120 in)	0 cm (0 in)	(Mexico) CHIHUAHUA
3	Carlos Santana Alcaraz Vergara	6 June 2002	1.9 m (6 ft 3 in)	91 kg (201 lb)	312 cm (123 in)	0 cm (0 in)	(Mexico) CHIHUAHUA
5	Josue De La Riva Muela	17 June 2003	1.86 m (6 ft 1 in)	82 kg (181 lb)	305 cm (120 in)	0 cm (0 in)	(Mexico) CHIHUAHUA
6	Josue De Jesus Lopez Rios	21 July 2002	1.95 m (6 ft 5 in)	83 kg (183 lb)	312 cm (123 in)	0 cm (0 in)	(Mexico) NUEVO LEON
9	Luis David Hernandez Baca	4 January 2001	1.96 m (6 ft 5 in)	77 kg (170 lb)	333 cm (131 in)	0 cm (0 in)	(Mexico) JALISCO
10	Luis Ramon Lopez Anchondo	5 September 2001	1.94 m (6 ft 4 in)	85 kg (187 lb)	328 cm (129 in)	0 cm (0 in)	(Mexico) CHIHUAHUA
11	Aldo Humberto Zambrano Rueda	9 June 2001	1.91 m (6 ft 3 in)	75 kg (165 lb)	324 cm (128 in)	0 cm (0 in)	(Mexico) NUEVO LEON
13	Ramon Eduardo Gonzalez Castro	20 January 2003	1.97 m (6 ft 6 in)	74 kg (163 lb)	328 cm (129 in)	0 cm (0 in)	(Mexico) CHIHUAHUA
14	Ernesto Martinez Lespron	7 December 2001	1.74 m (5 ft 9 in)	72 kg (159 lb)	300 cm (120 in)	0 cm (0 in)	(Mexico) CHIHUAHUA
15	Franky Adrian Hernandez Milantony	4 March 2002	1.94 m (6 ft 4 in)	87 kg (192 lb)	322 cm (127 in)	0 cm (0 in)	(Mexico) BAJA CALIFORNIA
17	Jorge Ariel Hernández Cabrera	14 August 2003	1.98 m (6 ft 6 in)	80 kg (180 lb)	336 cm (132 in)	0 cm (0 in)	(Mexico) BAJA CALIFORNIA
19	Neyton Jesus Fletes Zepeda	18 October 2001	1.83 m (6 ft 0 in)	71 kg (157 lb)	310 cm (120 in)	0 cm (0 in)	(Mexico) NAYARIT

== Pool D ==
=== Dominican Republic ===
The following is the Dominican roster in the 2019 FIVB Volleyball Boys' U19 World Championship.

Head Coach: Loren Ricardo Rodriguez Martinez

No.	Name	Date of birth	Height	Weight	Spike	Block	2019 club
1	Fuhit Evens Edouard Cadit	13 September 2001	1.84 m (6 ft 0 in)	74 kg (163 lb)	246 cm (97 in)	0 cm (0 in)	(Dominican Republic) Higuey
2	Diego Andres Garcia Brito	21 April 2001	1.9 m (6 ft 3 in)	72 kg (159 lb)	240 cm (94 in)	0 cm (0 in)	(Dominican Republic) Santo Domingo
3	Erik Florian Feliz	20 August 2001	1.84 m (6 ft 0 in)	70 kg (150 lb)	230 cm (91 in)	0 cm (0 in)	(Dominican Republic) Cabral
4	Leonardo Jesus Jorge Fabian	10 May 2001	1.81 m (5 ft 11 in)	85 kg (187 lb)	218 cm (86 in)	0 cm (0 in)	(Dominican Republic) Monte Plata
5	Brian Ramon Muñoz Lopez	26 April 2001	1.81 m (5 ft 11 in)	62 kg (137 lb)	234 cm (92 in)	0 cm (0 in)	(Dominican Republic) Bonao
6	Bryan Turbides Pepen	29 September 2001	1.77 m (5 ft 10 in)	58 kg (128 lb)	228 cm (90 in)	0 cm (0 in)	(Dominican Republic) Santo Domingo
7	Juan Daniel Feliz Perez	2 November 2001	1.4 m (4 ft 7 in)	80 kg (180 lb)	335 cm (132 in)	0 cm (0 in)	(Dominican Republic) Santo Domingo
8	Jose Anthony Rodriguez Cruz	28 January 2001	1.84 m (6 ft 0 in)	63 kg (139 lb)	230 cm (91 in)	0 cm (0 in)	(Dominican Republic) Sajoma
9	Jhoan Jesus Capellan Rodriguez (c)	6 April 2001	1.75 m (5 ft 9 in)	54 kg (119 lb)	230 cm (91 in)	0 cm (0 in)	(Dominican Republic) Haina
10	Stiven Jesus Lopez	18 June 2001	1.84 m (6 ft 0 in)	75 kg (165 lb)	220 cm (87 in)	0 cm (0 in)	(Dominican Republic) Santiago
11	Elvis De Jesus Rodriguez Suero	17 November 2002	1.81 m (5 ft 11 in)	70 kg (150 lb)	225 cm (89 in)	0 cm (0 in)	(Dominican Republic) San Jose de las Matas
12	Mason William Matos Logrono	25 September 2001	1.81 m (5 ft 11 in)	70 kg (150 lb)	230 cm (91 in)	0 cm (0 in)	(Dominican Republic) Santo Domingo
13	Rafael Daniel Montero Avalo	6 March 2002	1.86 m (6 ft 1 in)	70 kg (150 lb)	230 cm (91 in)	0 cm (0 in)	(Dominican Republic) Bani
14	Reggie Williams Gerardo Bautista	6 January 2001	1.95 m (6 ft 5 in)	88 kg (194 lb)	255 cm (100 in)	0 cm (0 in)	(Dominican Republic) Distrito Nacional
15	Luther Hadasher Rosario Adames	28 April 2003	1.97 m (6 ft 6 in)	78 kg (172 lb)	255 cm (100 in)	0 cm (0 in)	(Dominican Republic) Santo Domingo
16	Francisco Ernesto Cerda Polanco	16 December 2003	1.7 m (5 ft 7 in)	50 kg (110 lb)	210 cm (83 in)	0 cm (0 in)	(Dominican Republic) Santo Domingo
17	Christian Salvador Urbaez Feliz	8 October 2001	1.88 m (6 ft 2 in)	72 kg (159 lb)	225 cm (89 in)	0 cm (0 in)	(Dominican Republic) Barahona
19	Angel Emilio Herrera Francisco	9 October 2002	1.81 m (5 ft 11 in)	70 kg (150 lb)	218 cm (86 in)	0 cm (0 in)	(Dominican Republic) Fantino
20	Oscar Alexander Jaquez Rodriguez	7 June 2001	1.39 m (4 ft 7 in)	80 kg (180 lb)	335 cm (132 in)	0 cm (0 in)	(Dominican Republic) Sajom

=== South Korea ===
The following is the Korean roster in the 2019 FIVB Volleyball Boys' U19 World Championship.

Head Coach: Kang Soo-young

No.	Name	Date of birth	Height	Weight	Spike	Block	2019 club
1	Joung Han-yong	31 July 2001	1.94 m (6 ft 4 in)	91 kg (201 lb)	310 cm (120 in)	295 cm (116 in)	(South Korea) Jecheon Industrial Highschool
2	Kim U-gyeom	21 August 2001	1.97 m (6 ft 6 in)	80 kg (180 lb)	310 cm (120 in)	305 cm (120 in)	(South Korea) Susung Highschool
3	Lee Hyeon-seung (c)	2 January 2001	1.91 m (6 ft 3 in)	76 kg (168 lb)	305 cm (120 in)	300 cm (120 in)	(South Korea) Namsung Highschool
4	Park Yu-hyeon	12 April 2001	1.82 m (6 ft 0 in)	80 kg (180 lb)	300 cm (120 in)	295 cm (116 in)	(South Korea) Jecheon Industrial Highschool
5	Kim Tae-won	21 February 2001	1.84 m (6 ft 0 in)	70 kg (150 lb)	295 cm (116 in)	280 cm (110 in)	(South Korea) Jecheon Industrial Highschool
6	Hong Dong-seon	16 May 2001	1.99 m (6 ft 6 in)	80 kg (180 lb)	320 cm (130 in)	312 cm (123 in)	(South Korea) Songsan Highschool
7	Ham Dong-jun	20 May 2002	1.94 m (6 ft 4 in)	85 kg (187 lb)	320 cm (130 in)	324 cm (128 in)	(South Korea) Sokcho Highschool
8	Choi Yo-reum	7 May 2001	1.90 m (6 ft 3 in)	79 kg (174 lb)	310 cm (120 in)	295 cm (116 in)	(South Korea) Inha Uni. Highschool
9	Bae Ha-jun	31 July 2001	1.98 m (6 ft 6 in)	78 kg (172 lb)	320 cm (130 in)	310 cm (120 in)	(South Korea) Kyungpook Uni. Highschool
10	Jang Ji-won	17 March 2001	1.77 m (5 ft 10 in)	70 kg (150 lb)	270 cm (110 in)	260 cm (100 in)	(South Korea) Namsung Highschool
11	Park Seung-su	30 January 2002	1.94 m (6 ft 4 in)	89 kg (196 lb)	320 cm (130 in)	305 cm (120 in)	(South Korea) Kyungpook Uni. Highschool
12	Lee Hyeon-jin	2 January 2001	1.94 m (6 ft 4 in)	74 kg (163 lb)	310 cm (120 in)	295 cm (116 in)	(South Korea) Namsung Highschool

=== Nigeria ===
The following is the NGRerian roster in the 2019 FIVB Volleyball Boys' U19 World Championship.

Head Coach: Sani Mohammed Musa

No.	Name	Date of birth	Height	Weight	Spike	Block	2019 club
1	Nanlir Stanley	21 February 2001	1.8 m (5 ft 11 in)	68 kg (150 lb)	278 cm (109 in)	0 cm (0 in)	(Nigeria) Platuae Rocks
2	Obaje Josiah	28 February 2002	1.93 m (6 ft 4 in)	60 kg (130 lb)	297 cm (117 in)	0 cm (0 in)	(Nigeria) Rubicon Volleyball Academy
3	Precious Peter	15 May 2002	1.75 m (5 ft 9 in)	60 kg (130 lb)	293 cm (115 in)	0 cm (0 in)	(Nigeria) NGReria Immigration Service
4	Abubakar Sadiq Ahmed	4 December 2002	1.77 m (5 ft 10 in)	70 kg (150 lb)	230 cm (91 in)	0 cm (0 in)	(Nigeria) Rubicon Volleyball Academy
5	Ismail Usman	8 August 2001	1.8 m (5 ft 11 in)	79 kg (174 lb)	312 cm (123 in)	0 cm (0 in)	(Nigeria) Zanfara Volleyball Club
6	Chinedu Pascal Ekechi	21 November 2001	1.92 m (6 ft 4 in)	78 kg (172 lb)	368 cm (145 in)	0 cm (0 in)	(Nigeria) Sunshine Volley Club
7	Usman Shehu	9 October 2002	1.94 m (6 ft 4 in)	70 kg (150 lb)	333 cm (131 in)	0 cm (0 in)	(Nigeria) Sokoto Volleyball Club
8	Ahmed Abdulrasheed	10 October 2001	1.85 m (6 ft 1 in)	78 kg (172 lb)	322 cm (127 in)	0 cm (0 in)	(Nigeria) NGRer Brass Volleyball Club
9	Emmanuel Udah	7 December 2003	1.95 m (6 ft 5 in)	80 kg (180 lb)	321 cm (126 in)	0 cm (0 in)	(Nigeria) NGReria Customs Service
10	Ayuba Isaac	12 January 2001	1.95 m (6 ft 5 in)	45 kg (99 lb)	321 cm (126 in)	0 cm (0 in)	(Nigeria) Scorpions Volleyball Club
11	Sani Kyali	24 September 2001	1.85 m (6 ft 1 in)	75 kg (165 lb)	289 cm (114 in)	0 cm (0 in)	(Nigeria) NGRer Brass Volleyball Club
12	Prince Okechukwu Anyasodike	23 September 2001	2.01 m (6 ft 7 in)	88 kg (194 lb)	355 cm (140 in)	0 cm (0 in)	(Nigeria) NGReria Immigration Service
13	Oforah Izuchukwu	27 May 2002	2 m (6 ft 7 in)	80 kg (180 lb)	340 cm (130 in)	0 cm (0 in)	(Nigeria) NGReria Security And Civil Def
14	Bruno Tochukwu Ibe	7 December 2001	1.95 m (6 ft 5 in)	62 kg (137 lb)	319 cm (126 in)	0 cm (0 in)	(Nigeria) Sunshine Volley Club
15	Chidiebere Emmanuel Okeke	28 December 2002	0 m (0 in)	0 kg (0 lb)	0 cm (0 in)	0 cm (0 in)	(Nigeria)
16	Bako Lucky	30 April 2002	1.85 m (6 ft 1 in)	81 kg (179 lb)	285 cm (112 in)	0 cm (0 in)	(Nigeria) Kano Pillars Volleyball Club
17	Afeez Mayowa Bello	12 January 2002	1.95 m (6 ft 5 in)	73 kg (161 lb)	333 cm (131 in)	0 cm (0 in)	(Nigeria) Offa Volleyball Club
18	Are Oluwaseun	21 December 2002	1.91 m (6 ft 3 in)	77 kg (170 lb)	290 cm (110 in)	0 cm (0 in)	(Nigeria) Lagos State Volleyball
19	Victor Yusuf	10 April 2001	1.95 m (6 ft 5 in)	73 kg (161 lb)	333 cm (131 in)	0 cm (0 in)	(Nigeria) Spartans Volleyball Club
20	Johnpaul Ternamdoo Anshungu	25 July 2002	1.95 m (6 ft 5 in)	77 kg (170 lb)	302 cm (119 in)	0 cm (0 in)	(Nigeria) Femous Spikers

=== Russia ===
The following is the Russian roster in the 2019 FIVB Volleyball Boys' U19 World Championship.

Head Coach: Mikhail Nikolaev

No.	Name	Date of birth	Height	Weight	Spike	Block	2019 club
1	Anton Anoshko	25 March 2001	1.99 m (6 ft 6 in)	87 kg (192 lb)	340 cm (130 in)	0 cm (0 in)	(Russia) Nova
2	Artyom Korneyev	17 June 2002	1.97 m (6 ft 6 in)	87 kg (192 lb)	330 cm (130 in)	0 cm (0 in)	(Russia) Fakel
3	Mikhail Fedorov	1 February 2002	2.08 m (6 ft 10 in)	95 kg (209 lb)	340 cm (130 in)	0 cm (0 in)	(Russia) Zenit-UOR
4	Iurii Brazhniuk	19 February 2002	2.04 m (6 ft 8 in)	92 kg (203 lb)	340 cm (130 in)	0 cm (0 in)	(Russia) Lokomotiv
5	Nikita Gorbanov	31 August 2001	2.09 m (6 ft 10 in)	87 kg (192 lb)	350 cm (140 in)	0 cm (0 in)	(Russia) Lokomotiv
6	Stanislav Dineykin	15 September 2002	1.99 m (6 ft 6 in)	87 kg (192 lb)	330 cm (130 in)	0 cm (0 in)	(Russia) Dynamo Moscow
7	Danil Kharitonov	25 May 2001	2.01 m (6 ft 7 in)	90 kg (200 lb)	330 cm (130 in)	0 cm (0 in)	(Russia) Lokomotiv
8	Ilya Kazachenkov (c)	30 January 2001	2.09 m (6 ft 10 in)	95 kg (209 lb)	350 cm (140 in)	0 cm (0 in)	(Russia) Lokomotiv
9	Omar Kurbanov	23 February 2001	1.95 m (6 ft 5 in)	85 kg (187 lb)	330 cm (130 in)	0 cm (0 in)	(Russia) Grozny
10	Roman Murashko	24 May 2002	1.99 m (6 ft 6 in)	88 kg (194 lb)	330 cm (130 in)	0 cm (0 in)	(Russia) Lokomotiv
11	Korney Enns	2 February 2002	2.02 m (6 ft 8 in)	88 kg (194 lb)	340 cm (130 in)	0 cm (0 in)	(Russia) Fakel
12	Ilia Fedorov	1 August 2002	1.91 m (6 ft 3 in)	80 kg (180 lb)	320 cm (130 in)	0 cm (0 in)	(Russia) Zenit-UOR
13	Egor Kasatkin	13 January 2002	1.92 m (6 ft 4 in)	80 kg (180 lb)	330 cm (130 in)	0 cm (0 in)	(Russia) Fakel
14	Aleksandr Sinitsyn	23 March 2001	2.03 m (6 ft 8 in)	90 kg (200 lb)	350 cm (140 in)	0 cm (0 in)	(Russia) Zenit-UOR
15	Vadim Syropiatov	10 June 2001	2 m (6 ft 7 in)	96 kg (212 lb)	340 cm (130 in)	0 cm (0 in)	(Russia) Lokomotiv-Izumrud
16	Denis Khromov	22 March 2001	2.09 m (6 ft 10 in)	97 kg (214 lb)	330 cm (130 in)	0 cm (0 in)	(Russia) Zenit Saint Petersburg
17	Mikhail Vyshnikov	5 October 2001	1.99 m (6 ft 6 in)	88 kg (194 lb)	340 cm (130 in)	0 cm (0 in)	(Russia) Yaroslavich
18	Stanislav Antonov	27 April 2001	2.07 m (6 ft 9 in)	92 kg (203 lb)	340 cm (130 in)	0 cm (0 in)	(Russia) Dynamo Moscow
19	Kirill Ionov	31 October 2001	2.06 m (6 ft 9 in)	94 kg (207 lb)	330 cm (130 in)	0 cm (0 in)	(Russia) Zenit Saint Petersburg
20	Denis Tolok	24 March 2001	1.99 m (6 ft 6 in)	87 kg (192 lb)	330 cm (130 in)	0 cm (0 in)	(Russia) Zenit-UOR

=== United States ===
The following is the American roster in the 2019 FIVB Volleyball Boys' U19 World Championship.

Head Coach: David Hunt

No.	Name	Date of birth	Height	Weight	Spike	Block	2019 club
1	Kevin Kauling	8 February 2001	2.01 m (6 ft 7 in)	86 kg (190 lb)	357 cm (141 in)	0 cm (0 in)	(United States) Sports Performance
2	Cole Power	31 July 2001	1.8 m (5 ft 11 in)	68 kg (150 lb)	319 cm (126 in)	0 cm (0 in)	(United States) Balboa Bay Volleyball Club
3	Mason Briggs	21 January 2001	1.83 m (6 ft 0 in)	70 kg (150 lb)	319 cm (126 in)	0 cm (0 in)	(United States) Legacy Volleyball Club
4	Joseph Karlous	16 October 2001	1.83 m (6 ft 0 in)	77 kg (170 lb)	315 cm (124 in)	0 cm (0 in)	(United States) Balboa Bay Volleyball Club
5	Aidan Knipe	12 April 2001	1.83 m (6 ft 0 in)	73 kg (161 lb)	329 cm (130 in)	0 cm (0 in)	(United States) Team Rockstar
6	Henry Wedbush	31 July 2001	1.91 m (6 ft 3 in)	79 kg (174 lb)	334 cm (131 in)	0 cm (0 in)	(United States) SCVC
7	Akhil Tangutur	11 March 2001	1.93 m (6 ft 4 in)	75 kg (165 lb)	342 cm (135 in)	0 cm (0 in)	(United States) Pac6 Volleyball Club
8	Akinola Akinwumi	6 February 2001	1.96 m (6 ft 5 in)	90 kg (200 lb)	340 cm (130 in)	0 cm (0 in)	(United States) Team Rockstar
9	Clarke Godbold	22 April 2002	1.96 m (6 ft 5 in)	91 kg (201 lb)	339 cm (133 in)	0 cm (0 in)	(United States) SCVC
10	James Hartley	8 February 2001	1.96 m (6 ft 5 in)	80 kg (180 lb)	335 cm (132 in)	0 cm (0 in)	(United States) Carolina Union Volleyball Club
11	Rico Wardlow	20 March 2001	1.97 m (6 ft 6 in)	86 kg (190 lb)	347 cm (137 in)	0 cm (0 in)	(United States) Sports Performance Volleyball
12	Alexander Knight (c)	22 June 2001	1.98 m (6 ft 6 in)	82 kg (181 lb)	345 cm (136 in)	0 cm (0 in)	(United States) Pac6 Volleyball Club
13	Ethan Hill	26 February 2001	1.98 m (6 ft 6 in)	82 kg (181 lb)	353 cm (139 in)	0 cm (0 in)	(United States) Balboa Bay Volleyball Club
14	Francesco Sani	16 July 2002	1.98 m (6 ft 6 in)	88 kg (194 lb)	353 cm (139 in)	0 cm (0 in)	(United States) TVP 18
15	Joseph Deluzio	24 April 2001	1.98 m (6 ft 6 in)	93 kg (205 lb)	334 cm (131 in)	0 cm (0 in)	(United States) MVP
16	Klistan Lawrence	7 January 2003	2.01 m (6 ft 7 in)	81 kg (179 lb)	342 cm (135 in)	0 cm (0 in)	(United States) 352 Elite
17	Gavin Julien	17 March 2001	2.03 m (6 ft 8 in)	84 kg (185 lb)	353 cm (139 in)	0 cm (0 in)	(United States) Milwaukee Volleyball Club
18	Gavin Leising	15 April 2002	2.03 m (6 ft 8 in)	88 kg (194 lb)	351 cm (138 in)	0 cm (0 in)	(United States) Legacy VBC
19	Nathaniel Gates	26 January 2001	2.03 m (6 ft 8 in)	88 kg (194 lb)	340 cm (130 in)	0 cm (0 in)	(United States) Coast Volleyball Club
20	Scott Solan	2 June 2001	2.03 m (6 ft 8 in)	88 kg (194 lb)	352 cm (139 in)	0 cm (0 in)	(United States) Vegas United Volleyball Club

== See also ==
- 2019 FIVB Volleyball Girls' U18 World Championship squads
