= 2021 FIVB Volleyball Boys' U19 World Championship =

Volleyball Championship

2021 Boys' U19 World Championship
والیبال قهرمانی زیر ۱۹ سال پسران جهان تهران ۲۰۲۱

Tournament details
- Host country: Iran
- City: Tehran
- Dates: 24 August – 2 September
- Teams: 20 (from 5 confederations)
- Venue: 2 (in 1 host city)

Final positions
- Champions: Poland (2nd title)
- Runners-up: Bulgaria
- Third place: Iran
- Fourth place: Russia

Tournament awards
- MVP: (Poland) Tytus Nowik
- Best Setter: (Bulgaria) Stoil Palev
- Best OH: (Bulgaria) Aleksandar Nikolov (Poland) Kamil Szymendera
- Best MB: (Iran) Yousef Kazemi (Poland) Jakub Majchrzak
- Best OPP: (Poland) Tytus Nowik
- Best Libero: (Poland) Kuba Hawryluk

The 2021 FIVB Volleyball Boys' U19 World Championship was the 17th edition of the FIVB Volleyball Boys' U19 World Championship, contested by the men's national teams under the age of 19 of the members of the FIVB, the sport's global governing body. The tournament was held in Iran from 24 August to 2 September 2021.

Italy were the defending champions, having won their second title in Tunisia.

Players must be born on or after 1 January 2003.

== Qualification ==
A total of 20 teams will qualify for the final tournament. In addition to Iran who qualified automatically as hosts, the other 19 teams will qualify from five separate continental competitions.

Means of qualification	Date	Venue	Vacancies	Qualifier
Host country	13 October 2020	(Iran) Kerman	1	Iran
2018 Asian Championship^{1}	29 June – 6 July 2018	(Iran) Tabriz	1	~~Japan~~
2018 Asian Championship^{1}	29 June – 6 July 2018	(Iran) Tabriz	1	~~South Korea~~
2018 Asian Championship^{1}	29 June – 6 July 2018	(Iran) Tabriz	1	~~Chinese Taipei~~
2018 Asian Championship^{1}	29 June – 6 July 2018	(Iran) Tabriz	1	Thailand*
NORCECA Ranking^{2}	January 2020	(Dominican Republic) Santo Domingo	2	Cuba
NORCECA Ranking^{2}	January 2020	(Dominican Republic) Santo Domingo	2	~~United States~~
NORCECA Ranking^{2}	January 2020	(Dominican Republic) Santo Domingo	2	~~Puerto Rico~~
NORCECA Ranking^{2}	January 2020	(Dominican Republic) Santo Domingo	2	Guatemala*
2020 European Championship	5–13 September 2020	(Italy) Lecce & Marsicovetere	6	Italy
2020 European Championship	5–13 September 2020	(Italy) Lecce & Marsicovetere	6	Czech Republic
2020 European Championship	5–13 September 2020	(Italy) Lecce & Marsicovetere	6	Poland
2020 European Championship	5–13 September 2020	(Italy) Lecce & Marsicovetere	6	Bulgaria
2020 European Championship	5–13 September 2020	(Italy) Lecce & Marsicovetere	6	Germany
2020 European Championship	5–13 September 2020	(Italy) Lecce & Marsicovetere	6	Belgium
2020 African Championship	4–8 March 2021	(Nigeria) Abuja	2	Nigeria
2020 African Championship	4–8 March 2021	(Nigeria) Abuja	2	Cameroon
South American Ranking			2	Brazil
South American Ranking			2	Colombia
FIVB World Rankings			6	Egypt
FIVB World Rankings			6	Russia
FIVB World Rankings			6	Argentina
FIVB World Rankings			6	Belarus*
FIVB World Rankings			6	Dominican Republic*
FIVB World Rankings			6	India*
Total			20	

* Japan, South Korea, Chinese Taipei, United States and Puerto Rico withdrew from the competition. Thailand entered by the 5th place at the Asian Volleyball Championship and the other teams entered by the world ranking.

1.On 14 December 2020, AVC announced that the 2020 Asian Championship which was originally the AVC qualifier for the tournament was canceled due to COVID-19 pandemic and the top four teams of the 2018 Asian Championship which had not yet qualified to the tournament qualified as the AVC representatives.
2.On 30 November 2020, NORCECA announced that the 2020 NORCECA Championship which was originally the NORCECA qualifier for the tournament was canceled due to COVID-19 pandemic and the top four teams of the NORCECA Ranking as of January 2020 qualified as the NORCECA representatives.

== Pools composition ==
Pool A	Pool B	Pool C	Pool D
Iran (Host)	Italy (1)	Russia (2)	Argentina (3)
Nigeria (9)	Czech Republic (8)	Bulgaria (6)	Egypt (4)
Poland (14)	Brazil (13)	Cameroon (12)	Germany (11)
Guatemala (49)	Colombia (25)	Belgium (20)	Cuba (18)
India (49)	Belarus (10)	Thailand (49)	Dominican Republic (24)

== Venues ==
Pool A, B and Final round	2021 FIVB Volleyball Boys' U19 World Championship (Iran)	Pool C, D and Final round
Tehran, Iran	2021 FIVB Volleyball Boys' U19 World Championship (Iran)	Tehran, Iran
Azadi Indoor Stadium	2021 FIVB Volleyball Boys' U19 World Championship (Iran)	Azadi Volleyball Hall
Capacity: 12,000	2021 FIVB Volleyball Boys' U19 World Championship (Iran)	Capacity: 3,000

== Pool standing procedure ==
1. Number of matches won
2. Match points
3. Sets ratio
4. Points ratio
5. If the tie continues as per the point ratio between two teams, the priority will be given to the team which won the last match between them. When the tie in points ratio is between three or more teams, a new classification of these teams in the terms of points 1, 2 and 3 will be made taking into consideration only the matches in which they were opposed to each other.

Match won 3–0 or 3–1: 3 match points for the winner, 0 match points for the loser
Match won 3–2: 2 match points for the winner, 1 match point for the loser

== Preliminary round ==
- All times are Iran Daylight Time (UTC+04:30).

=== Pool A ===
Pos	Team	Pld	W	L	Pts	SW	SL	SR	SPW	SPL	SPR	Qualification
1	Poland	4	4	0	12	12	0	MAX	300	150	2.000	Round of 16
2	Iran	4	3	1	9	9	3	3.000	286	185	1.546	Round of 16
3	India	4	2	2	6	6	7	0.857	280	237	1.181	Round of 16
4	Nigeria	4	1	3	3	4	9	0.444	255	249	1.024	Round of 16
5	Guatemala (Note: Guatemala was forced to withdraw after several team members tested positive for COVID-19 and their games were forfeited.)	4	0	4	0	0	12	0.000	0	300	0.000	17th–20th places

Notes:

Date	Time		Score		Set 1	Set 2	Set 3	Set 4	Set 5	Total	Report
24 Aug	13:00	Nigeria	1–3	India	17–25	25–23	21–25	24–26		87–99	P2Report
25 Aug	13:00	Poland	3–0	Nigeria	25–10	25–14	25–18			75–42	P2Report
25 Aug	19:00	Iran	3–0	India	25–22	25–15	25–22			75–59	P2Report
26 Aug	19:00	Poland	3–0	India	25–14	25–15	25–18			75–47	P2Report
27 Aug	19:00	Iran	0–3	Poland	23–25	23–25	15–25			61–75	P2Report
28 Aug	19:00	Iran	3–0	Nigeria	25–19	25–13	25–19			75–51	P2Report

=== Pool B ===
Pos	Team	Pld	W	L	Pts	SW	SL	SR	SPW	SPL	SPR	Qualification
1	Italy	4	4	0	12	12	0	MAX	306	233	1.313	Round of 16
2	Brazil	4	3	1	8	9	6	1.500	350	308	1.136	Round of 16
3	Czech Republic	4	2	2	7	8	7	1.143	336	329	1.021	Round of 16
4	Colombia	4	1	3	3	5	10	0.500	316	374	0.845	Round of 16
5	Belarus	4	0	4	0	1	12	0.083	259	323	0.802	17th–20th places

Date	Time		Score		Set 1	Set 2	Set 3	Set 4	Set 5	Total	Report
24 Aug	10:00	Czech Republic	3–1	Colombia	21–25	25–18	32–30	25–17		103–90	P2Report
24 Aug	16:00	Italy	3–0	Brazil	27–25	25–21	25–21			77–67	P2Report
25 Aug	10:00	Brazil	3–0	Belarus	25–20	25–16	25–21			75–57	P2Report
25 Aug	16:00	Italy	3–0	Czech Republic	25–19	29–27	25–15			79–61	P2Report
26 Aug	10:00	Italy	3–0	Belarus	25–21	25–16	25–17			75–54	P2Report
26 Aug	16:00	Brazil	3–1	Colombia	27–29	25–12	25–12	26–24		103–77	P2Report
27 Aug	10:00	Italy	3–0	Colombia	25–17	25–16	25–18			75–51	P2Report
27 Aug	16:00	Czech Republic	3–0	Belarus	25–13	25–19	25–23			75–55	P2Report
28 Aug	10:00	Brazil	3–2	Czech Republic	25–21	21–25	19–25	25–17	15–9	105–97	P2Report
28 Aug	16:00	Colombia	3–1	Belarus	25–18	25–23	19–25	29–27		98–93	P2Report

=== Pool C ===
Pos	Team	Pld	W	L	Pts	SW	SL	SR	SPW	SPL	SPR	Qualification
1	Russia	4	4	0	12	12	2	6.000	361	319	1.132	Round of 16
2	Bulgaria	4	3	1	9	10	3	3.333	331	283	1.170	Round of 16
3	Belgium	4	2	2	6	7	7	1.000	338	338	1.000	Round of 16
4	Thailand	4	1	3	3	4	10	0.400	312	331	0.943	Round of 16
5	Cameroon	4	0	4	0	1	12	0.083	252	323	0.780	17th–20th places

Date	Time		Score		Set 1	Set 2	Set 3	Set 4	Set 5	Total	Report
24 Aug	10:00	Bulgaria	3–0	Thailand	25–19	25–21	25–22			75–62	P2Report
24 Aug	19:00	Russia	3–1	Belgium	23–25	25–23	25–19	34–32		107–99	P2Report
25 Aug	13:00	Bulgaria	1–3	Russia	25–21	22–25	30–32	22–25		99–103	P2Report
25 Aug	16:00	Thailand	3–1	Cameroon	21–25	25–13	25–21	25–20		96–79	P2Report
26 Aug	10:00	Russia	3–0	Cameroon	25–17	26–24	25–19			76–60	P2Report
26 Aug	13:00	Belgium	0–3	Bulgaria	30–32	17–25	15–25			62–82	P2Report
27 Aug	13:00	Cameroon	0–3	Belgium	19–25	16–25	22–25			57–75	P2Report
27 Aug	16:00	Russia	3–0	Thailand	25–15	25–23	25–23			75–61	P2Report
28 Aug	10:00	Thailand	1–3	Belgium	21–25	28–26	19–25	24–26		92–102	P2Report
28 Aug	19:00	Cameroon	0–3	Bulgaria	19–25	18–25	19–25			56–75	P2Report

=== Pool D ===
Pos	Team	Pld	W	L	Pts	SW	SL	SR	SPW	SPL	SPR	Qualification
1	Argentina	4	4	0	12	12	2	6.000	342	213	1.606	Round of 16
2	Germany	4	3	1	9	10	3	3.333	317	201	1.577	Round of 16
3	Egypt	4	2	2	5	6	8	0.750	286	258	1.109	Round of 16
4	Cuba	4	1	3	4	6	9	0.667	312	285	1.095	Round of 16
5	Dominican Republic (Note: Dominican Republic was forced to withdraw after several team members tested positive for COVID-19 and their games were forfeited.)	4	0	4	0	0	12	0.000	0	300	0.000	17th–20th places

Notes:

Date	Time		Score		Set 1	Set 2	Set 3	Set 4	Set 5	Total	Report
24 Aug	13:00	Egypt	0–3	Argentina	16–25	10–25	22–25			48–75	P2Report
24 Aug	16:00	Germany	3–0	Cuba	25–19	25–19	25–18			75–56	P2Report
25 Aug	10:00	Argentina	3–1	Germany	25–23	25–22	19–25	25–22		94–92	P2Report
26 Aug	16:00	Argentina	3–1	Cuba	25–18	25–17	23–25	25–13		98–73	P2Report
27 Aug	10:00	Egypt	0–3	Germany	19–25	15–25	17–25			51–75	P2Report
28 Aug	13:00	Egypt	3–2	Cuba	24–26	27–25	21–25	25–23	15–9	112–108	P2Report

== Final round ==
- All times are Iran Daylight Time (UTC+04:30).

=== 17th–18th places ===
Pos	Team	Pld	W	L	Pts	SW	SL	SR	SPW	SPL	SPR	Result
17	Belarus	3	3	0	9	9	0	MAX	225	48	4.688	17th place
18	Cameroon	3	2	1	6	6	3	2.000	198	75	2.640	18th place
19	Guatemala	2	0	2	0	0	6	0.000	0	150	0.000	19th place
19	Dominican Republic	2	0	2	0	0	6	0.000	0	150	0.000	19th place

Date	Time		Score		Set 1	Set 2	Set 3	Set 4	Set 5	Total	Report
30 Aug	20:10	Belarus	3–0	Cameroon	25–20	25–13	25–15			75–48	P2Report

== Final sixteen ==
Round of 16
30 Aug
Argentina	3
Thailand	0
30 Aug
Iran	3
Czech Republic	0
30 Aug
Germany	3
Belgium	2
30 Aug
Poland	3
Colombia	0
30 Aug
Italy	3
Nigeria	0
30 Aug
Bulgaria	3
Egypt	0
30 Aug
Brazil	3
India	0
30 Aug
Russia	3
Cuba	0

Quarterfinals
31 Aug
Argentina	1
Iran	3
31 Aug
Germany	0
Poland	3
31 Aug
Italy	2
Bulgaria	3
31 Aug
Brazil	0
Russia	3

Semifinals
1 Sep
Iran	1
Poland	3
1 Sep
Bulgaria	3
Russia	2

Final
2 Sep
Poland	3
Bulgaria	0
3rd place match
2 Sep
Iran	3
Russia	2

5th–8th semifinals
1 Sep
Argentina	3
Germany	0
1 Sep
Italy	3
Brazil	0

5th place match
2 Sep
Argentina	3
Italy	1
7th place match
2 Sep
Germany	1
Brazil	3

9th–16th quarterfinals
31 Aug
Thailand	1
Czech Republic	3
31 Aug
Belgium	3
Colombia	0
31 Aug
Nigeria	1
Egypt	3
31 Aug
India	3
Cuba	0

9th–12th semifinals
1 Sep
Czech Republic	3
Belgium	1
1 Sep
Egypt	2
India	3

9th place match
2 Sep
Czech Republic	3
India	1
11th place match
2 Sep
Belgium	3
Egypt	1

13th–15th semifinals
1 Sep
Thailand	3
Colombia	2
1 Sep
Nigeria	3
Cuba	2

13th place match
2 Sep
Thailand	3
Nigeria	2

=== Round of 16 ===
Date	Time		Score		Set 1	Set 2	Set 3	Set 4	Set 5	Total	Report
30 Aug	9:30	Bulgaria	3–0	Egypt	25–14	25–22	25–12			75–48	P2Report
30 Aug	10:00	Italy	3–0	Nigeria	25–14	25–17	25–15			75–46	P2Report
30 Aug	12:00	Russia	3–0	Cuba	25–19	25–18	25–17			75–54	P2Report
30 Aug	13:00	Brazil	3–0	India	25–19	25–17	25–23			75–59	P2Report
30 Aug	14:30	Argentina	3–0	Thailand	25–15	25–17	25–15			75–47	P2Report
30 Aug	16:00	Poland	3–0	Colombia	25–19	25–22	25–12			75–53	P2Report
30 Aug	17:00	Germany	3–2	Belgium	17–25	28–26	17–25	29–27	15–9	106–112	P2Report
30 Aug	19:00	Iran	3–0	Czech Republic	26–24	25–20	25–13			76–57	P2Report

=== 9th–16th quarterfinals ===
Date	Time		Score		Set 1	Set 2	Set 3	Set 4	Set 5	Total	Report
31 Aug	10:00	Nigeria	1–3	Egypt	25–22	19–25	21–25	23–25		88–97	P2Report
31 Aug	13:00	India	3–0	Cuba	25–20	25–17	25–17			75–54	P2Report
31 Aug	16:00	Thailand	1–3	Czech Republic	22–25	17–25	25–23	20–25		84–98	P2Report
31 Aug	19:00	Belgium	3–0	Colombia	32–30	25–22	25–17			82–69	P2Report

=== Quarterfinals ===
Date	Time		Score		Set 1	Set 2	Set 3	Set 4	Set 5	Total	Report
31 Aug	10:00	Italy	2–3	Bulgaria	27–25	25–27	25–21	29–31	16–18	122–122	P2Report
31 Aug	13:30	Brazil	0–3	Russia	19–25	25–27	15–25			59–77	P2Report
31 Aug	16:00	Germany	0–3	Poland	19–25	23–25	26–28			68–78	P2Report
31 Aug	19:00	Argentina	1–3	Iran	21–25	26–24	19–25	11–25		77–99	P2Report

=== 13th–16th semifinals ===
Date	Time		Score		Set 1	Set 2	Set 3	Set 4	Set 5	Total	Report
1 Sep	10:00	Thailand	3–2	Colombia	23–25	25–21	25–20	19–25	15–11	107–102	P2Report
1 Sep	13:00	Nigeria	3–2	Cuba	25–10	25–20	22–25	20–25	15–13	107–93	P2Report

=== 9th–12th semifinals ===
Date	Time		Score		Set 1	Set 2	Set 3	Set 4	Set 5	Total	Report
1 Sep	16:00	Czech Republic	3–1	Belgium	25–18	25–18	21–25	25–20		96–81	P2Report
1 Sep	19:00	Egypt	2–3	India	25–16	27–25	26–28	16–25	12–15	106–109	P2Report

=== 5th–8th semifinals ===
Date	Time		Score		Set 1	Set 2	Set 3	Set 4	Set 5	Total	Report
1 Sep	10:00	Argentina	3–0	Germany	25–23	25–18	25–23			75–64	P2Report
1 Sep	13:00	Italy	3–0	Brazil	25–18	25–17	25–18			75–53	P2Report

=== Semifinals ===
Date	Time		Score		Set 1	Set 2	Set 3	Set 4	Set 5	Total	Report
1 Sep	16:00	Bulgaria	3–2	Russia	14–25	25–21	25–20	20–25	15–13	99–104	P2Report
1 Sep	19:10	Iran	1–3	Poland	24–26	23–25	25–23	20–25		92–99	P2Report

=== 13th place match ===
Date	Time		Score		Set 1	Set 2	Set 3	Set 4	Set 5	Total	Report
2 Sep	12:30	Thailand	3–2	Nigeria	25–15	25–20	17–25	26–28	15–13	108–101	P2Report

=== 11th place match ===
Date	Time		Score		Set 1	Set 2	Set 3	Set 4	Set 5	Total	Report
2 Sep	15:15	Belgium	3–1	Egypt	23–25	25–14	25–19	25–23		98–81	P2Report

=== 9th place match ===
Date	Time		Score		Set 1	Set 2	Set 3	Set 4	Set 5	Total	Report
2 Sep	17:30	Czech Republic	3–1	India	25–21	25–16	22–25	25–16		97–78	P2Report

=== 7th place match ===
Date	Time		Score		Set 1	Set 2	Set 3	Set 4	Set 5	Total	Report
2 Sep	10:00	Germany	1–3	Brazil	17–25	25–23	24–26	24–26		90–100	P2Report

=== 5th place match ===
Date	Time		Score		Set 1	Set 2	Set 3	Set 4	Set 5	Total	Report
2 Sep	13:00	Argentina	3–1	Italy	18–25	25–20	25–19	25–21		93–85	P2Report

=== 3rd place match ===
Date	Time		Score		Set 1	Set 2	Set 3	Set 4	Set 5	Total	Report
2 Sep	16:00	Iran	3–2	Russia	25–14	22–25	27–25	21–25	15–6	110–95	P2Report

=== Final ===
Date	Time		Score		Set 1	Set 2	Set 3	Set 4	Set 5	Total	Report
2 Sep	19:00	Poland	3–0	Bulgaria	25–20	25–19	25–19			75–58	P2 Report

== Final standings ==
Rank	Team
1st place, gold medalist(s)	Poland
2nd place, silver medalist(s)	Bulgaria
3rd place, bronze medalist(s)	Iran
4	Russia
5	Argentina
6	Italy
7	Brazil
8	Germany
9	Czech Republic
10	India
11	Belgium
12	Egypt
13	Thailand
14	Nigeria
15	Colombia
15	Cuba
17	Belarus
18	Cameroon
19	Dominican Republic
19	Guatemala

2021 Boys' U19 World champions

Poland
2nd title

12–man roster
Jakub Majchrzak, Kamil Szymendera, Jakub Olszewski, Kajetan Kubicki, Tytus Nowik, Mateusz Kufka, Piotr Śliwka, Dominik Czerny, Kuba Hawryluk, Mateusz Nowak, Damian Biliński, Kacper Ratajewski
Head coach
Michał Bąkiewicz

== Awards ==
- Most valuable player
  (Poland) Tytus Nowik
- Best setter
  (Bulgaria) Stoil Palev
- Best outside spikers
  (Bulgaria) Aleksandar Nikolov
  (Poland) Kamil Szymendera
- Best middle blockers
  (Iran) Yousef Kazemi
  (Poland) Jakub Majchrzak
- Best opposite spiker
  (Poland) Tytus Nowik
- Best libero
  (Poland) Kuba Hawryluk

== Statistics leaders ==
=== All round ===
Statistics leaders correct as of All round.

Best Scorers
	Player	Attacks	Blocks	Serves	Total
1	(Belgium) Ferre Reggers	131	17	10	158
2	(Bulgaria) Aleksandar Nikolov	112	8	16	136
3	(Colombia) Martinez Palacios	108	21	0	129
4	(Italy) Luca Porro	105	6	11	122
5	(Brazil) Arthur Bento	104	7	5	116

Best Attackers
	Player	Spikes	Errors	Attempts	Total
1	(Belgium) Ferre Reggers	131	42	107	16.38%
2	(Bulgaria) Aleksandar Nikolov	109	24	53	15.57%
3	(Colombia) Martinez Palacios	108	55	74	15.43%
4	(Russia) Mikhail Labinskii	108	43	62	13.50%
5	(Russia) Timofei Tikhonov	108	33	57	13.50%

Best Blockers
	Player	Blocks	Errors	Rebounds	% per match
1	(Czech Republic) Jakub Klajmon	32	26	7	4.00%
2	(Argentina) Imanol Salazar	26	39	28	3.71%
3	(Colombia) Martinez Palacios	21	19	14	3.00%
4	(Poland) Jakub Majchrzak	20	21	14	2.86%
5	(Iran) Yousef Kazemi	18	37	21	2.57%

Best Servers
	Player	Aces	Errors	Attempts	% per match
1	(Russia) Kirill Vlasov	19	24	58	2.38%
2	(Bulgaria) Aleksandar Nikolov	16	27	76	2.00%
3	(Iran) Khanzadeh Firouzjah	12	14	68	1.71%
4	(Italy) Luca Porro	11	28	79	1.38%
5	(Russia) Mikhail Labinskii	11	28	80	1.38%

Best Setters
	Player	Successful	Errors	Attempts	Success %
1	(Thailand) Choedchai Chimphiphob	284	10	441	38.64%
2	(Czech Republic) Simon Bryknar	257	3	406	32.12%
3	(Italy) Mattia Boninfante	195	1	428	31.25%
4	(Egypt) Eid Yassin	165	5	423	27.82%
5	(Russia) Nikita Borchikov	159	4	260	37.59%

Best Diggers
	Player	Digs	Errors	Receptions	% per match
1	(Italy) Gabriele Laurenzano	83	26	4	10.38%
2	(Czech Republic) Matej Salek	73	32	12	9.12%
3	(India) Venu Chikkanna	65	21	7	9.29%
3	(Argentina) Albrecht Manuel	60	14	5	8.57%
5	(Poland) Kuba Hawryluk	60	14	11	8.57%

Best Receivers
	Player	Successful	Error	Attempts	Success %
1	(Russia) Mikhail Labinskii	70	3	105	39.33%
2	(India) Venu Chikkanna	69	3	119	36.13%
3	(Argentina) Lucas Conde	66	5	99	38.82%
4	(Iran) Sajad Jelodarian Maman	64	5	78	43.54%
5	(Cuba) lvaro Luis Ricardo Gomez	54	7	115	30.68%

== See also ==
- 2021 FIVB Volleyball Girls' U18 World Championship
