= Russia men's national under-19 volleyball team =

Youth volleyball team representing Russia

Russia U19
- Association: Volleyball Federation Of Russia

Uniforms
Home	Away	Third

Youth Olympic Games
- Appearances: 1 (First in 2010)
- Best result: (bronze) Bronze Medalist : (2010)

FIVB U19 World Championship
- Appearances: 13 (First in 1995)
- Best result: (gold) Champions : (1999, 2005, 2013)
- www.volley.ru (in Russian)

The Russia men's national under-19 volleyball team represents Russia in international men's volleyball competitions and friendly matches under the age 19 and it is ruled by the Russian Volleyball Federation body that is an affiliate of the Federation of International Volleyball FIVB and also part of the European Volleyball Confederation CEV.

In response to the 2022 Russian invasion of Ukraine, the International Volleyball Federation suspended all Russian national teams, clubs, and officials, as well as beach and snow volleyball athletes, from all events. The European Volleyball Confederation (CEV) also banned all Russian national teams, clubs, and officials from participating in European competition, and suspended all members of Russia from their respective functions in CEV organs.

== Results ==
=== Summer Youth Olympics ===
Champions Runners up Third place Fourth place

Youth Olympic Games
Year	Round	Position	Pld	W	L	SW	SL	Squad
(Singapore) 2010		Third place						Squad
(China) 2014	No Volleyball Event							
(Argentina) 2018	No Volleyball Event							
Total	0 Titles	1/1						

=== FIVB U19 World Championship ===
Champions Runners up Third place Fourth place

FIVB U19 World Championship
Year	Round	Position	Pld	W	L	SW	SL	Squad
(United Arab Emirates) 1989	Didn't qualify							
(Portugal) 1991	Didn't qualify							
(Turkey) 1993	Didn't qualify							
(Puerto Rico) 1995		6th place						Squad
(Iran) 1997	Didn't qualify							
(Saudi Arabia) 1999		Champions						Squad
(Egypt) 2001		Third place						Squad
(Thailand) 2003		5th place						Squad
(Algeria) 2005		Champions						Squad
(Mexico) 2007		9th place						Squad
(Italy) 2009		4th place						Squad
(Argentina) 2011		13th place						Squad
(Mexico) 2013		Champions						Squad
(Argentina) 2015		4th place						Squad
(Bahrain) 2017		Runners-Up						Squad
(Tunisia) 2019		Runners-Up						Squad
(Iran) 2021		4th place						Squad
Total	3 Titles	13/17						

=== Europe U19 / U18 Championship ===
Champions Runners up Third place Fourth place

Europe U19 / U18 Championship
Year	Round	Position	Pld	W	L	SW	SL	Squad
(Spain) 1995		Champions						Squad
(Slovakia) 1997		7th place						Squad
(Poland) 1999		Champions						Squad
(Czech Republic) 2001		Champions						Squad
(Croatia) 2003		Champions						Squad
(Latvia) 2005		5th place						Squad
(Austria) 2007		4th place						Squad
(Netherlands) 2009		Third place						Squad
(Turkey) 2011		Third place						Squad
(Bosnia and Herzegovina) / (Serbia) 2013		Champions						Squad
(Turkey) 2015		5th place						Squad
(Hungary) / (Slovakia) 2017		4th place						Squad
(Czech Republic) / (Slovakia) 2018		4th place						Squad
(Italy) 2020	Withdrew							Squad
(Georgia (country)) 2022	Disqualified							Squad
Total	5 Titles	13/15						

== Team ==
=== Current squad ===
The following is the Russian roster in the 2019 FIVB Volleyball Boys' U19 World Championship.

Head Coach: Mikhail Nikolaev

No.	Name	Date of birth	Height	Weight	Spike	Block	2019 club
1	Anton Anoshko	25 March 2001	1.99 m (6 ft 6 in)	87 kg (192 lb)	340 cm (130 in)	0 cm (0 in)	(Russia) Nova
2	Artyom Korneyev	17 June 2002	1.97 m (6 ft 6 in)	87 kg (192 lb)	330 cm (130 in)	0 cm (0 in)	(Russia) Fakel
3	Mikhail Fedorov	1 February 2002	2.08 m (6 ft 10 in)	95 kg (209 lb)	340 cm (130 in)	0 cm (0 in)	(Russia) Zenit-UOR
4	Iurii Brazhniuk	19 February 2002	2.04 m (6 ft 8 in)	92 kg (203 lb)	340 cm (130 in)	0 cm (0 in)	(Russia) Lokomotiv
5	Nikita Gorbanov	31 August 2001	2.09 m (6 ft 10 in)	87 kg (192 lb)	350 cm (140 in)	0 cm (0 in)	(Russia) Lokomotiv
6	Stanislav Dineykin	15 September 2002	1.99 m (6 ft 6 in)	87 kg (192 lb)	330 cm (130 in)	0 cm (0 in)	(Russia) Dynamo Moscow
7	Danil Kharitonov	25 May 2001	2.01 m (6 ft 7 in)	90 kg (200 lb)	330 cm (130 in)	0 cm (0 in)	(Russia) Lokomotiv
8	Ilya Kazachenkov (c)	30 January 2001	2.09 m (6 ft 10 in)	95 kg (209 lb)	350 cm (140 in)	0 cm (0 in)	(Russia) Lokomotiv
9	Omar Kurbanov	23 February 2001	1.95 m (6 ft 5 in)	85 kg (187 lb)	330 cm (130 in)	0 cm (0 in)	(Russia) Grozny
10	Roman Murashko	24 May 2002	1.99 m (6 ft 6 in)	88 kg (194 lb)	330 cm (130 in)	0 cm (0 in)	(Russia) Lokomotiv
11	Korney Enns	2 February 2002	2.02 m (6 ft 8 in)	88 kg (194 lb)	340 cm (130 in)	0 cm (0 in)	(Russia) Fakel
12	Ilia Fedorov	1 August 2002	1.91 m (6 ft 3 in)	80 kg (180 lb)	320 cm (130 in)	0 cm (0 in)	(Russia) Zenit-UOR
13	Egor Kasatkin	13 January 2002	1.92 m (6 ft 4 in)	80 kg (180 lb)	330 cm (130 in)	0 cm (0 in)	(Russia) Fakel
14	Aleksandr Sinitsyn	23 March 2001	2.03 m (6 ft 8 in)	90 kg (200 lb)	350 cm (140 in)	0 cm (0 in)	(Russia) Zenit-UOR
15	Vadim Syropiatov	10 June 2001	2 m (6 ft 7 in)	96 kg (212 lb)	340 cm (130 in)	0 cm (0 in)	(Russia) Lokomotiv-Izumrud
16	Denis Khromov	22 March 2001	2.09 m (6 ft 10 in)	97 kg (214 lb)	330 cm (130 in)	0 cm (0 in)	(Russia) Zenit Saint Petersburg
17	Mikhail Vyshnikov	5 October 2001	1.99 m (6 ft 6 in)	88 kg (194 lb)	340 cm (130 in)	0 cm (0 in)	(Russia) Yaroslavich
18	Stanislav Antonov	27 April 2001	2.07 m (6 ft 9 in)	92 kg (203 lb)	340 cm (130 in)	0 cm (0 in)	(Russia) Dynamo Moscow
19	Kirill Ionov	31 October 2001	2.06 m (6 ft 9 in)	94 kg (207 lb)	330 cm (130 in)	0 cm (0 in)	(Russia) Zenit Saint Petersburg
20	Denis Tolok	24 March 2001	1.99 m (6 ft 6 in)	87 kg (192 lb)	330 cm (130 in)	0 cm (0 in)	(Russia) Zenit-UOR
