= Komeil Akbari =

Iranian volleyball player

Personal information
- Nationality: Iran
- Born: 6 August 2001 Urmia, Iran
- Height: 2.05 m (6 ft 9 in)
- Spike: 3.50 m (138 in)
- Block: 3.30 m (130 in)

Volleyball information
- Position: Outside hitter
- Current club: (Iran) Mes Rafsanjan

Career
- Years: Team
- 2017–2018 2018–2019 2019–2020 2020–2021 2021–2022 2023–2024 2023–2024 2024–2025 2025–2026 2026-: (Iran) Shahrdari Urmia VC (Iran) Dorna Urmia (Iran) Shahrdari Arak (Portugal) Castelo da Maia GC (North Macedonia) Vardar Skopje (Mongolia) Nature Med (Iran) Sanatgaran Omid (Iran) Pas Gorgan (Iran) Mes Rafsanjan (Greece) Athlos Orestiadas

National team
- Years: Team
- –: Iran U-18; Iran U-19; Iran U-20; Iran
Honours
Representing Iran
Men's volleyball
Asian Men's U18 Volleyball Championship
Gold medal – first place	2018 Tabriz	Team

Komeil Akbari (born 6 August 2001 in Urmia, Iran) is an Iranian volleyball player who plays as an outside hitter for Mes Rafsanjan. He has represented Iran at several youth levels and has also played for the senior national team.

Akbari has also played professionally in Portugal. In 2020, he joined Castelo da Maia GC, competing in the Portuguese volleyball league.

== Honors ==
- Asian Men's U19 Volleyball Championship
  - Bronze medal: 2018
- Asian Men's U18 Volleyball Championship
  - Gold medal: 2018
- CISM Tournament
  - Gold medal: 2024
