= 2020 Men's Asian U18 Volleyball Championship =

Tournament details
- Host country: Canceled (originally Iran)
- City: Canceled (originally Shiraz)
- Dates: Canceled (originally 9–16 January 2021)

The 2020 Men's Asian U18 Volleyball Championship was to be the 13th edition of the Men's Asian U18 Volleyball Championship, a biennial international volleyball tournament organised by the Asian Volleyball Confederation (AVC), that year with the Islamic Republic of Iran Volleyball Federation (IRIVF). The tournament was later scheduled to be held in Shiraz, Iran from 9 to 16 January 2021. It was originally scheduled to take place in Riffa, Bahrain from 7 to 14 July 2020, but was moved to 2021 due to the COVID-19 pandemic.

On 14 December 2020, AVC announced that the tournament, which was originally the AVC qualifier for the 2021 FIVB Volleyball Boys' U19 World Championship, was to be moved further due to the continuing COVID-19 pandemic, and the top four teams of the 2018 Asian Boys' U18 Volleyball Championship that had not yet qualified to the 2021 U19 World Championship already qualified for the same Championship and would be the AVC's representatives.

== See also ==
- 2020 Asian Girls' U17 Volleyball Championship
