= 2019 FIVB Volleyball Boys' U19 World Championship =

2019 Boys' U19 World Championship
بطولة العالم للكرة الطائرة رجال تحت 19 عاما 2019 تونس
- Official logo

Tournament details
- Host country: Tunisia
- Dates: 21–30 August
- Teams: 20 (from 5 confederations)
- Venue: 2 (in 2 host cities)

Final positions
- Champions: Italy (2nd title)
- Runners-up: Russia
- Third place: Argentina
- Fourth place: Egypt

Tournament awards
- MVP: (Italy) Tommaso Rinaldi
- Best Setter: (Italy) Paolo Porro
- Best OH: (Italy) Tommaso Rinaldi (Russia) Omar Kurbanov
- Best MB: (Italy) Nicola Cianciotta (Argentina) Agustin Gallardo
- Best OPP: (Russia) Roman Murashko
- Best Libero: (Russia) Ilia Fedorov

The 2019 FIVB Volleyball Boys' U19 World Championship was the sixteenth edition of the FIVB Volleyball Boys' U19 World Championship, contested by the men's national teams under the age of 19 of the members of the FIVB, the sport's global governing body. The tournament was held in Tunis and Radès, Tunisia from 21 to 30 August 2019. Tunisia played hosts for this event for the first time.

The finals involved 20 teams, of which 19 came through qualifying competitions, while the host nation qualified automatically. Of the 20 teams, 13 had also appeared in the previous tournament in 2017, while Colombia and Nigeria made their first appearances at a FIVB Volleyball Boys' U19 World Championship.

Iran was the defending champions, having won their second title in Bahrain.

Players must be born on or after 1 January 2001.

== Qualification ==
A total of 20 teams qualified for the final tournament. In addition to Tunisia who qualified automatically as hosts, the other 19 teams qualified from five separate continental competitions.

Means of qualification	Date	Venue	Vacancies	Qualifier
Host Country	28 August 2018	(Switzerland) Lausanne	1	Tunisia
2018 European Championship	7–15 April 2018	(Czech Republic) Zlín & (Slovakia) Púchov	6	Germany
2018 European Championship	7–15 April 2018	(Czech Republic) Zlín & (Slovakia) Púchov	6	Czech Republic
2018 European Championship	7–15 April 2018	(Czech Republic) Zlín & (Slovakia) Púchov	6	Italy
2018 European Championship	7–15 April 2018	(Czech Republic) Zlín & (Slovakia) Púchov	6	Russia
2018 European Championship	7–15 April 2018	(Czech Republic) Zlín & (Slovakia) Púchov	6	Belarus
2018 European Championship	7–15 April 2018	(Czech Republic) Zlín & (Slovakia) Púchov	6	Bulgaria
2018 NORCECA Championship	6–10 June 2018	(Costa Rica) San José	2	Cuba
2018 NORCECA Championship	6–10 June 2018	(Costa Rica) San José	2	United States
2018 Asian Championship	29 June – 6 July 2018	(Iran) Tabriz	4	Japan
2018 Asian Championship	29 June – 6 July 2018	(Iran) Tabriz	4	South Korea
2018 Asian Championship	29 June – 6 July 2018	(Iran) Tabriz	4	Iran
2018 Asian Championship	29 June – 6 July 2018	(Iran) Tabriz	4	Chinese Taipei
2018 African Youth Games	19–24 July 2018	(Algeria) Algiers	2	Nigeria^{1}
2018 African Youth Games	19–24 July 2018	(Algeria) Algiers	2	Egypt
2018 South American Championship	24–28 October 2018	(Colombia) Sopó	3	Brazil
2018 South American Championship	24–28 October 2018	(Colombia) Sopó	3	Argentina
2018 South American Championship	24–28 October 2018	(Colombia) Sopó	3	Colombia^{1}
2019 Pan-American Cup for NORCECA	24–29 April 2019	(Dominican Republic) Santo Domingo	2	Mexico
2019 Pan-American Cup for NORCECA	24–29 April 2019	(Dominican Republic) Santo Domingo	2	Dominican Republic
Total			20	

1.Teams that made their debut.

== Pools composition ==
Teams were seeded in the first two positions of each pool following the serpentine system according to their FIVB U19 World Ranking as of 1 January 2019. FIVB reserved the right to seed the hosts as heads of pool A regardless of the U19 World Ranking. All teams not seeded were drawn to take other available positions in the remaining lines, following the U19 World Ranking. Each pool had no more than three teams from the same confederation. The draw was held in Tunis, Tunisia on 27 June 2019. Rankings are shown in brackets except the hosts who ranked 17th.

Seeded teams		Pot 1	Pot 2	Pot 3
Tunisia (Hosts); Iran (1); Japan (2); Russia (3)	South Korea (4); Egypt (5); Czech Republic (6); Brazil (7)	Italy (9); Argentina (10); Cuba (11); United States (12)	Germany (15); Nigeria (16); Colombia (18); Chinese Taipei (21)	Belarus (26); Bulgaria (31); Mexico (35); Dominican Republic (72)

Draw

Pool A	Pool B	Pool C	Pool D
Tunisia	Iran	Japan	Russia
Brazil	Czech Republic	Egypt	South Korea
Cuba	Italy	Argentina	United States
Chinese Taipei	Colombia	Germany	Nigeria
Belarus	Bulgaria	Mexico	Dominican Republic

== Venues ==
Pool A, B and Final round	Pool C, D and Final round
Tunis, Tunisia	Radès, Tunisia
El Menzah Sports Palace	Salle Omnisport de Radès
Capacity: 5,500	Capacity: 17,000

== Pool standing procedure ==
1. Number of matches won
2. Match points
3. Sets ratio
4. Points ratio
5. If the tie continues as per the point ratio between two teams, the priority will be given to the team which won the last match between them. When the tie in points ratio is between three or more teams, a new classification of these teams in the terms of points 1, 2 and 3 will be made taking into consideration only the matches in which they were opposed to each other.

Match won 3–0 or 3–1: 3 match points for the winner, 0 match points for the loser
Match won 3–2: 2 match points for the winner, 1 match point for the loser

== Preliminary round ==
- All times are Central European Time (UTC+01:00).

=== Pool A ===
Pos	Team	Pld	W	L	Pts	SW	SL	SR	SPW	SPL	SPR	Qualification
1	Brazil	4	3	1	10	11	4	2.750	363	314	1.156	Round of 16
2	Cuba	4	3	1	8	10	6	1.667	373	348	1.072	Round of 16
3	Belarus	4	2	2	6	9	9	1.000	390	373	1.046	Round of 16
4	Chinese Taipei	4	1	3	4	6	9	0.667	302	337	0.896	Round of 16
5	Tunisia	4	1	3	2	3	11	0.273	286	342	0.836	17th–20th places

Date	Time		Score		Set 1	Set 2	Set 3	Set 4	Set 5	Total	Report
21 Aug	10:00	Chinese Taipei	2–3	Belarus	15–25	25–22	16–25	25–13	5–15	86–100	P2
21 Aug	22:00	Cuba	3–0	Tunisia	25–22	25–14	25–18			75–54	P2
22 Aug	16:30	Cuba	3–2	Brazil	23–25	21–25	25–22	25–18	27–25	121–115	P2
22 Aug	19:30	Tunisia	3–2	Belarus	25–22	15–25	25–23	26–28	15–12	106–110	P2
23 Aug	10:00	Chinese Taipei	1–3	Cuba	18–25	25–17	19–25	20–25		82–92	P2
23 Aug	19:30	Brazil	3–0	Tunisia	27–25	25–17	25–14			77–56	P2
24 Aug	13:00	Belarus	1–3	Brazil	16–25	25–19	25–27	17–25		83–96	P2
24 Aug	19:30	Tunisia	0–3	Chinese Taipei	25–27	26–28	19–25			70–80	P2
25 Aug	10:00	Belarus	3–1	Cuba	25–21	25–23	22–25	25–16		97–85	P2
25 Aug	19:30	Brazil	3–0	Chinese Taipei	25–17	25–17	25–20			75–54	P2

=== Pool B ===
Pos	Team	Pld	W	L	Pts	SW	SL	SR	SPW	SPL	SPR	Qualification
1	Italy	4	4	0	11	12	3	4.000	357	248	1.440	Round of 16
2	Czech Republic	4	3	1	9	9	3	3.000	264	232	1.138	Round of 16
3	Iran	4	2	2	6	7	8	0.875	323	340	0.950	Round of 16
4	Bulgaria	4	1	3	4	6	10	0.600	331	366	0.904	Round of 16
5	Colombia	4	0	4	0	2	12	0.167	261	350	0.746	17th–20th places

Date	Time		Score		Set 1	Set 2	Set 3	Set 4	Set 5	Total	Report
21 Aug	13:00	Bulgaria	2–3	Italy	14–25	25–21	17–25	25–22	7–15	88–108	P2
21 Aug	16:00	Czech Republic	3–0	Colombia	25–13	25–16	25–17			75–46	P2
22 Aug	10:00	Italy	3–0	Czech Republic	25–14	25–12	25–13			75–39	P2
22 Aug	13:00	Iran	3–1	Bulgaria	25–21	21–25	25–22	25–20		96–88	P2
23 Aug	13:00	Czech Republic	3–0	Iran	25–17	25–17	25–22			75–56	P2
23 Aug	16:30	Colombia	0–3	Italy	18–25	19–25	13–25			50–75	P2
24 Aug	10:00	Iran	3–1	Colombia	25–27	25–21	25–17	25–13		100–78	P2
24 Aug	16:30	Bulgaria	0–3	Czech Republic	22–25	11–25	22–25			55–75	P2
25 Aug	13:00	Colombia	1–3	Bulgaria	16–25	21–25	26–24	24–26		87–100	P2
25 Aug	16:30	Italy	3–1	Iran	25–16	25–18	24–26	25–11		99–71	P2

=== Pool C ===
Pos	Team	Pld	W	L	Pts	SW	SL	SR	SPW	SPL	SPR	Qualification
1	Egypt	4	4	0	10	12	5	2.400	373	349	1.069	Round of 16
2	Japan	4	2	2	7	9	6	1.500	342	304	1.125	Round of 16
3	Argentina	4	2	2	6	8	8	1.000	349	366	0.954	Round of 16
4	Germany	4	2	2	6	8	9	0.889	362	362	1.000	Round of 16
5	Mexico	4	0	4	1	3	12	0.250	299	344	0.869	17th–20th places

Date	Time		Score		Set 1	Set 2	Set 3	Set 4	Set 5	Total	Report
21 Aug	10:00	Mexico	1–3	Argentina	21–25	25–17	14–25	20–25		80–92	P2
21 Aug	13:00	Egypt	3–2	Germany	17–25	27–25	25–17	13–25	17–15	99–107	P2
22 Aug	10:00	Argentina	1–3	Egypt	23–25	16–25	25–21	12–25		76–96	P2
22 Aug	13:00	Japan	3–0	Mexico	25–17	25–21	25–13			75–51	P2
23 Aug	10:00	Egypt	3–2	Japan	25–19	25–20	23–25	15–25	15–10	103–99	P2
23 Aug	13:00	Germany	3–1	Argentina	25–21	22–25	25–20	25–21		97–87	P2
24 Aug	10:00	Japan	3–0	Germany	25–14	25–22	25–20			75–56	P2
24 Aug	13:00	Mexico	0–3	Egypt	23–25	23–25	21–25			67–75	P2
25 Aug	10:00	Germany	3–2	Mexico	25–21	23–25	25–18	14–25	15–12	102–101	P2
25 Aug	13:00	Argentina	3–1	Japan	25–23	18–25	26–24	25–21		94–93	P2

=== Pool D ===
Pos	Team	Pld	W	L	Pts	SW	SL	SR	SPW	SPL	SPR	Qualification
1	Russia	4	4	0	12	12	1	12.000	322	224	1.438	Round of 16
2	United States	4	2	2	6	7	6	1.167	285	300	0.950	Round of 16
3	South Korea	4	2	2	6	7	7	1.000	332	310	1.071	Round of 16
4	Nigeria	4	2	2	6	6	6	1.000	266	282	0.943	Round of 16
5	Dominican Republic	4	0	4	0	0	12	0.000	222	311	0.714	17th–20th places

Date	Time		Score		Set 1	Set 2	Set 3	Set 4	Set 5	Total	Report
21 Aug	16:00	Dominican Republic	0–3	United States	18–25	29–31	17–25			64–81	P2
21 Aug	18:30	South Korea	0–3	Nigeria	20–25	26–28	24–26			70–79	P2
22 Aug	16:30	United States	1–3	South Korea	27–25	17–25	20–25	22–25		86–100	P2
22 Aug	19:30	Russia	3–0	Dominican Republic	25–17	25–14	25–17			75–48	P2
23 Aug	16:30	South Korea	1–3	Russia	25–22	21–25	18–25	23–25		87–97	P2
23 Aug	19:30	Nigeria	0–3	United States	22–25	19–25	20–25			61–75	P2
24 Aug	16:30	Russia	3–0	Nigeria	25–15	25–14	25–17			75–46	P2
24 Aug	19:30	Dominican Republic	0–3	South Korea	17–25	16–25	15–25			48–75	P2
25 Aug	16:30	Nigeria	3–0	Dominican Republic	25–17	30–28	25–17			80–62	P2
25 Aug	19:30	United States	0–3	Russia	12–25	19–25	12–25			43–75	P2

== Final round ==
- All times are Central European Time (UTC+01:00).

=== 17th–20th places ===
Pos	Team	Pld	W	L	Pts	SW	SL	SR	SPW	SPL	SPR
17	Tunisia	3	2	1	7	8	4	2.000	274	258	1.062
18	Mexico	3	2	1	5	8	7	1.143	299	306	0.977
19	Dominican Republic	3	2	1	5	6	6	1.000	265	259	1.023
20	Colombia	3	0	3	1	4	9	0.444	271	286	0.948

Date	Time	Venue		Score		Set 1	Set 2	Set 3	Set 4	Set 5	Total	Report
27 Aug	22:00	EMS	Tunisia	3–0	Dominican Republic	27–25	25–21	26–24			78–70	P2
27 Aug	22:20	SOR	Colombia	2–3	Mexico	23–25	25–14	25–18	20–25	11–15	104–97	P2
28 Aug	22:15	SOR	Tunisia	3–1	Colombia	25–20	24–26	25–15	25–21		99–82	P2
28 Aug	22:20	EMS	Mexico	2–3	Dominican Republic	15–25	21–25	25–17	25–23	10–15	96–105	P2
29 Aug	22:00	EMS	Colombia	1–3	Dominican Republic	13–25	20–25	25–11	27–29		85–90	P2
29 Aug	22:08	SOR	Tunisia	2–3	Mexico	25–21	25–20	14–25	23–25	10–15	97–106	P2

=== Final sixteen ===
Round of 16
27 August – Tunis
Russia	3
Germany	0
27 August – Radès
Cuba	0
Iran	3
27 August – Tunis
United States	0
Argentina	3
27 August – Radès
Brazil	2
Bulgaria	3
27 August – Tunis
Italy	3
Chinese Taipei	0
27 August – Radès
Japan	3
South Korea	1
27 August – Tunis
Czech Republic	0
Belarus	3
27 August – Radès
Egypt	3
Nigeria	0

Quarterfinals
28 August – Tunis
Russia	3
Iran	1
28 August – Tunis
Argentina	3
Bulgaria	2
28 August – Tunis
Italy	3
Japan	0
28 August – Tunis
Belarus	0
Egypt	3

Semifinals
29 August – Tunis
Russia	3
Argentina	0
29 August – Tunis
Italy	3
Egypt	0

Final
30 August – Tunis
Russia	1
Italy	3
3rd place match
30 August – Tunis
Argentina	3
Egypt	1

5th–8th semifinals
29 August – Tunis
Iran	3
Bulgaria	0
29 August – Tunis
Japan	3
Belarus	1

5th place match
30 August – Tunis
Iran	3
Japan	1
7th place match
30 August – Tunis
Bulgaria	3
Belarus	1

9th–16th quarterfinals
28 August – Radès
Germany	0
Cuba	3
28 August – Radès
United States	2
Brazil	3
28 August – Radès
Chinese Taipei	0
South Korea	3
28 August – Radès
Czech Republic	3
Nigeria	2

9th–12th semifinals
29 August – Radès
Cuba	0
Brazil	3
29 August – Radès
South Korea	2
Czech Republic	3

9th place match
30 August – Radès
Brazil	3
Czech Republic	0
11th place match
30 August – Radès
Cuba	1
South Korea	3

13th–16th semifinals
29 August – Radès
Germany	3
United States	1
29 August – Radès
Chinese Taipei	0
Nigeria	3

13th place match
30 August – Radès
Germany	3
Nigeria	0
15th place match
30 August – Radès
United States	3
Chinese Taipei	0

==== Round of 16 ====
Date	Time	Venue		Score		Set 1	Set 2	Set 3	Set 4	Set 5	Total	Report
27 Aug	10:00	EMS	Italy	3–0	Chinese Taipei	25–7	25–17	25–22			75–46	P2
27 Aug	10:00	SOR	Japan	3–1	South Korea	22–25	25–19	25–18	25–17		97–79	P2
27 Aug	13:00	EMS	Czech Republic	0–3	Belarus	23–25	20–25	20–25			63–75	P2
27 Aug	13:00	SOR	Egypt	3–0	Nigeria	25–16	25–20	29–27			79–63	P2
27 Aug	16:00	EMS	Russia	3–0	Germany	25–11	25–20	25–20			75–51	P2
27 Aug	16:00	SOR	Cuba	0–3	Iran	19–25	24–26	22–25			65–76	P2
27 Aug	19:00	EMS	United States	0–3	Argentina	20–25	19–25	14–25			53–75	P2
27 Aug	19:00	SOR	Brazil	2–3	Bulgaria	23–25	26–24	25–19	21–25	6–15	101–108	P2

==== 9th–16th quarterfinals ====
Date	Time	Venue		Score		Set 1	Set 2	Set 3	Set 4	Set 5	Total	Report
28 Aug	10:00	SOR	Chinese Taipei	0–3	South Korea	24–26	21–25	21–25			66–76	P2
28 Aug	13:00	SOR	Czech Republic	3–2	Nigeria	25–19	16–25	25–16	22–25	15–10	103–95	P2
28 Aug	16:00	SOR	Germany	0–3	Cuba	15–25	15–25	21–25			51–75	P2
28 Aug	19:00	SOR	United States	2–3	Brazil	26–24	23–25	25–21	17–25	10–15	101–110	P2

==== Quarterfinals ====
Date	Time	Venue		Score		Set 1	Set 2	Set 3	Set 4	Set 5	Total	Report
28 Aug	10:00	EMS	Italy	3–0	Japan	25–17	25–12	25–14			75–43	P2
28 Aug	13:00	EMS	Belarus	0–3	Egypt	21–25	18–25	18–25			57–75	P2
28 Aug	16:00	EMS	Russia	3–1	Iran	21–25	25–18	25–20	25–23		96–86	P2
28 Aug	19:00	EMS	Argentina	3–2	Bulgaria	25–19	21–25	26–24	21–25	15–13	108–106	P2

==== 13th–16th semifinals ====
Date	Time	Venue		Score		Set 1	Set 2	Set 3	Set 4	Set 5	Total	Report
29 Aug	10:00	SOR	Germany	3–1	United States	25–19	19–25	25–19	25–14		94–77	P2
29 Aug	13:00	SOR	Chinese Taipei	0–3	Nigeria	22–25	21–25	21–25			64–75	P2

==== 9th–12th semifinals ====
Date	Time	Venue		Score		Set 1	Set 2	Set 3	Set 4	Set 5	Total	Report
29 Aug	16:00	SOR	Cuba	0–3	Brazil	24–26	19–25	20–25			63–76	P2
29 Aug	19:00	SOR	South Korea	2–3	Czech Republic	29–31	25–22	18–25	25–19	14–16	111–113	P2

==== 5th–8th semifinals ====
Date	Time	Venue		Score		Set 1	Set 2	Set 3	Set 4	Set 5	Total	Report
29 Aug	10:00	EMS	Iran	3–0	Bulgaria	25–22	25–22	25–15			75–59	P2
29 Aug	13:00	EMS	Japan	3–1	Belarus	25–27	25–18	25–18	33–31		108–94	P2

==== Semifinals ====
Date	Time	Venue		Score		Set 1	Set 2	Set 3	Set 4	Set 5	Total	Report
29 Aug	16:00	EMS	Russia	3–0	Argentina	25–21	25–18	27–25			77–64	P2
29 Aug	19:00	EMS	Italy	3–0	Egypt	25–18	25–16	25–17			75–51	P2

==== 15th place match ====
Date	Time	Venue		Score		Set 1	Set 2	Set 3	Set 4	Set 5	Total	Report
30 Aug	09:00	SOR	United States	3–0	Chinese Taipei	25–20	25–21	25–15			75–56	P2

==== 13th place match ====
Date	Time	Venue		Score		Set 1	Set 2	Set 3	Set 4	Set 5	Total	Report
30 Aug	11:50	SOR	Germany	3–0	Nigeria	26–24	25–22	25–15			76–61	P2

==== 11th place match ====
Date	Time	Venue		Score		Set 1	Set 2	Set 3	Set 4	Set 5	Total	Report
30 Aug	14:40	SOR	Cuba	1–3	South Korea	21–25	25–18	24–26	23–25		93–94	P2

==== 9th place match ====
Date	Time	Venue		Score		Set 1	Set 2	Set 3	Set 4	Set 5	Total	Report
30 Aug	17:30	SOR	Brazil	3–0	Czech Republic	25–13	25–21	25–19			75–53	P2

==== 7th place match ====
Date	Time	Venue		Score		Set 1	Set 2	Set 3	Set 4	Set 5	Total	Report
30 Aug	09:00	EMS	Bulgaria	3–1	Belarus	25–21	25–19	20–25	25–17		95–82	P2

==== 5th place match ====
Date	Time	Venue		Score		Set 1	Set 2	Set 3	Set 4	Set 5	Total	Report
30 Aug	11:50	EMS	Iran	3–1	Japan	28–26	23–25	25–16	25–23		101–90	P2

==== 3rd place match ====
Date	Time	Venue		Score		Set 1	Set 2	Set 3	Set 4	Set 5	Total	Report
30 Aug	14:40	EMS	Argentina	3–1	Egypt	25–19	25–19	23–25	25–17		98–80	P2

==== Final ====
Date	Time	Venue		Score		Set 1	Set 2	Set 3	Set 4	Set 5	Total	Report
30 Aug	20:00	EMS	Russia	1–3	Italy	24–26	25–21	19–25	18–25		86–97	P2

== Final standing ==
Rank	Team
1st place, gold medalist(s)	Italy
2nd place, silver medalist(s)	Russia
3rd place, bronze medalist(s)	Argentina
4	Egypt
5	Iran
6	Japan
7	Bulgaria
8	Belarus
9	Brazil
10	Czech Republic
11	South Korea
12	Cuba
13	Germany
14	Nigeria
15	United States
16	Chinese Taipei
17	Tunisia
18	Mexico
19	Dominican Republic
20	Colombia

2019 Boys' U19 World champions

Italy
2nd title

12–man roster
Damiano Catania, Leonardo Ferrato, Federico Crosato, Alessandro Michieletto, Piervito Disabato (c), Alberto Pol, Tommaso Stefani, Alessandro Gianotti, Giulio Magalini, Tommaso Rinaldi, Paolo Porro, Nicola Cianciotta
Head coach
Vincenzo Fanizza

== Awards ==
- Most valuable player
  (Italy) Tommaso Rinaldi
- Best setter
  (Italy) Paolo Porro
- Best outside spikers
  (Italy) Tommaso Rinaldi
  (Russia) Omar Kurbanov
- Best middle blockers
  (Italy) Nicola Cianciotta
  (Argentina) Agustin Gallardo
- Best opposite spiker
  (Russia) Roman Murashko
- Best libero
  (Russia) Ilia Fedorov

== See also ==
- 2019 FIVB Volleyball Girls' U18 World Championship
