= Iran men's national under-19 volleyball team =

Iran
- Association: IRIVF
- Confederation: AVC

Uniforms
Home	Away	Third

FIVB U19 World Championship
- Appearances: 15 (First in 1989)
- Best result: (gold) (1997),(2007)

Asian U18 Championship
- Appearances: 12 (First in 2001)
- Best result: (gold) (2001, 2005, 2007, 2008, 2010, 2012, 2014)
- iranvolleyball.com

The Iran men's national under-19 volleyball team represents Iran in men's under-19 volleyball Events, it is controlled and managed by the Islamic Republic of Iran Volleyball Federation (I.R.I.V.F.) and takes part in international volleyball competitions since 1989.

== Results ==
=== FIVB Volleyball Boys' U19 World Championship ===
Champions Runners-up Third place

FIVB Volleyball Boys' U19 World Championship
Year	Rank	M	W	L	SW	SL	Ref
(United Arab Emirates) 1989	4th place	7	3	4	11	13	
(Portugal) 1991	Did Not Qualify						
(Turkey) 1993	Did Not Qualify						
(Puerto Rico) 1995	Did Not Qualify						
(Iran) 1997	9th place	4	1	3	6	9	
(Saudi Arabia) 1999	Did Not Qualify						
(Egypt) 2001	Runners-up	6	4	2	13	8	
(Thailand) 2003	Third place	7	5	2	13	8	
(Algeria) 2005	5th place	7	4	3	14	12	
(Mexico) 2007	Champions	8	5	3	18	16	
(Italy) 2009	Runners-up	8	6	2	21	9	
(Argentina) 2011	10th place	8	6	2	20	9	
(Mexico) 2013	4th place	8	5	3	16	13	
(Argentina) 2015	Third place	8	6	2	20	10	
(Bahrain) 2017	Champions	8	8	0	24	3	
(Tunisia) 2019	5th place	8	5	3	17	12	
(Iran) 2021	Third place	8	6	2	19	9	
(Argentina) 2023	Runners-up	8	7	1	22	6	
(Uzbekistan) 2025	4th place	9	5	4	21	16	
(India) 2027	To be determined						
Total	15/20	112	76	36	258	153	

=== Asian U19/18 Championship ===
Champions Runners up Third place Fourth place

Asian Boys' U18 Championship
Year	Rank	M	W	L	SW	SL	Ref
(Philippines) 1997	Did Not Compete						
(Taiwan) 1999	Did Not Compete						
(Iran) 2001	1st place	7	7	0	21	5	
(India) 2003	2nd place	7	6	1	19	5	
(Iran) 2005	1st place	6	6	0	18	2	
(Malaysia) 2007	1st place	8	6	2	19	7	
(Sri Lanka) 2008	1st place	7	7	0	21	4	
(Iran) 2010	1st place	6	5	1	16	10	
(Iran) 2012	1st place	6	6	0	18	5	
(Sri Lanka) 2014	2nd place	6	6	0	18	3	
(Myanmar) 2017	4th place	6	4	2	15	7	
(Iran) 2018	3rd place	6	4	2	13	8	
(Iran) 2020	Canceled						
(Iran) 2022	2nd place	6	5	1	15	4	
(Bahrain) 2024	2nd place	7	5	2	19	6	
Total	12/14	78	67	11	212	66	

=== Central Asian U19/18 Championship ===
Central Asian Boys' U19 Championship
Year	Rank	M	W	L	SW	SL	Ref
(Uzbekistan) 2024	2nd place	0	0	0	0	0	
(Uzbekistan) 2025	1st place	5	5	0	15	0	
Total	2/2	5	5	0	15	0	

== Links ==
- Theiranproject
- Official website
- FIVB profile
- Volleyballworld
