= Germany men's national under-19 volleyball team =

Germany Boys' U19
- Association: German Volleyball Association
- Confederation: CEV

Uniforms
Home	Away

Youth Olympic Games
- Appearances: No Appearances

FIVB U19 World Championship
- Appearances: 4 (First in 2007)
- Best result: 10th place : (2007)

Europe U19 / U18 Championship
- Appearances: 11 (First in 1999)
- Best result: (gold) Champions : (2018)
- www.volleyball-verband.de (in German)

The Germany men's national under-19 volleyball team represents Germany in international men's volleyball competitions and friendly matches under the age 19 and it is ruled by the German Volleyball Association body that is an affiliate of the Federation of International Volleyball FIVB and also part of the European Volleyball Confederation CEV.

== Results ==
=== Summer Youth Olympics ===
Champions Runners up Third place Fourth place

Youth Olympic Games
Year	Round	Position	Pld	W	L	SW	SL	Squad
(Singapore) 2010	Did not qualify							
(China) 2014	No Volleyball Event							
(Argentina) 2018	No Volleyball Event							
Total	0 Titles	0/1						

=== FIVB U19 World Championship ===
Champions Runners up Third place Fourth place

FIVB U19 World Championship
Year	Round	Position	Pld	W	L	SW	SL	Squad
(United Arab Emirates) 1989	Did not qualify							
(Portugal) 1991	Did not qualify							
(Turkey) 1993	Did not qualify							
(Puerto Rico) 1995	Did not qualify							
(Iran) 1997	Did not qualify							
(Saudi Arabia) 1999	Did not qualify							
(Egypt) 2001	Did not qualify							
(Thailand) 2003	Did not qualify							
(Algeria) 2005	Did not qualify							
(Mexico) 2007		10th place						Squad
(Italy) 2009	Did not qualify							
(Argentina) 2011	Did not qualify							
(Mexico) 2013	Did not qualify							
(Argentina) 2015		13th place						Squad
(Bahrain) 2017	Did not qualify							
(Tunisia) 2019		13th place						
(Iran) 2021		8th place						
(Argentina) 2023	Did not qualify							
(Uzbekistan) 2025	Did not qualify							
Total	0 Titles	4/19						

=== Europe U19 / U18 Championship ===
Champions Runners up Third place Fourth place

Europe U19 / U18 Championship
Year	Round	Position	Pld	W	L	SW	SL	Squad
(Spain) 1995	Did not qualify							
(Slovakia) 1997	Did not qualify							
(Poland) 1999		Runners-up						
(Czech Republic) 2001		5th place						
(Croatia) 2003		4th place						
(Latvia) 2005		10th place						
(Austria) 2007		5th place						
(Netherlands) 2009	Did not qualify							
(Turkey) 2011		11th place						
(Bosnia and Herzegovina) / (Serbia) 2013	Did not qualify							
(Turkey) 2015		4th place						
(Hungary) / (Slovakia) 2017	Did not qualify							
(Czech Republic) / (Slovakia) 2018		Champions						
(Italy) 2020		5th place						
(Georgia (country)) 2022		11th place						
(Bulgaria) 2024	Did not qualify							
(Italy) 2026		7th place						
Total	1 Title	11/17						

== Team ==
=== Current squad ===
The following players are the German players that have competed in the 2018 Boys' U18 Volleyball European Championship

#	name	position	height	weight	birthday	spike	block
	bierwisch ben	outside-spiker	194	89	2002	311	301
	Breburda jan	middle-blocker	196	90	2001	325	318
	Eckardt moritz	libero	183	74	2001	309	299
	Eichler pascal	opposite	200	91	2002	320	311
	Engelmann linus	libero	186	79	2002	311	299
	Gallas simon	outside-spiker	197	91	2001	315	305
	Gerken benedikt	setter	195	88	2001	312	301
	Heckel lennart	middle-blocker	199	91	2002	311	305
	Hieber markus	outside-spiker	196	90	2001	316	306
	Hosch tobias	setter	184	78	2001	310	301
	Hoyer julian	outside-spiker	192	85	2001	315	305
	Hüther franz	middle-blocker	206	90	2002	320	312
	John filip	opposite	202	89	2001	325	314
	Kersting maximilian	middle-blocker	196	86	2001	314	309
	Klooss adrian	libero	189	82	2001	311	299
	Kolakowski jan	middle-blocker	194	84	2001	312	309
	Lieb jason	setter	184	79	2001	310	301
	Pfretzschner simon	outside-spiker	189	78	2002	316	304
	Rein anselm	setter	189	75	2001	314	305
	Reusch johann	outside-spiker	183	76	2001	290	280
	Röhrs erik	outside-spiker	194	82	2001	319	310
	Schulz max	outside-spiker	194	80	2002	315	305
	Stoverink ben	outside-spiker	195	81	2001	318	308
	Torwie simon valentin	opposite	203	92	2001	321	311
