= Czech Republic men's national under-19 volleyball team =

Czech Republic Boys' U19
- Association: Czech Volleyball Association
- Confederation: CEV

Uniforms
Home	Away	Third

Youth Olympic Games
- Appearances: No Appearances

FIVB U19 World Championship
- Appearances: 7 (First in 1997)
- Best result: 4th place : (2003)

Europe U19 / U18 Championship
- Appearances: 11 (First in 1997)
- Best result: (gold) Champions : (2017)
- www.cvf.cz (in Czech)

The Czech Republic men's national under-19 volleyball team represents Czech Republic in international men's volleyball competitions and friendly matches under the age 19 and it is ruled by the Czech Volleyball Association body that is an affiliate of the Federation of International Volleyball FIVB and also part of the European Volleyball Confederation CEV.

== Results ==
=== Summer Youth Olympics ===
Champions Runners up Third place Fourth place

Youth Olympic Games
Year	Round	Position	Pld	W	L	SW	SL	Squad
(Singapore) 2010	Didn't qualify							
(China) 2014	No Volleyball Event							
(Argentina) 2018	No Volleyball Event							
Total	0 Titles	0/1						

=== FIVB U19 World Championship ===
Champions Runners up Third place Fourth place

FIVB U19 World Championship
Year	Round	Position	Pld	W	L	SW	SL	Squad
(United Arab Emirates) 1989	See Czechoslovakia							
(Portugal) 1991	See Czechoslovakia							
(Turkey) 1993	Didn't qualify							
(Puerto Rico) 1995	Didn't qualify							
(Iran) 1997		6th place						
(Saudi Arabia) 1999		8th place						
(Egypt) 2001		9th place						
(Thailand) 2003		4th place						
(Algeria) 2005	Didn't qualify							
(Mexico) 2007	Didn't qualify							
(Italy) 2009	Didn't qualify							
(Argentina) 2011	Didn't qualify							
(Mexico) 2013	Didn't qualify							
(Argentina) 2015	Didn't qualify							
(Bahrain) 2017		7th place						
(Tunisia) 2019		10th place						
(Iran) 2021		9th place						
(Argentina) 2023	Didn't qualify							
(Uzbekistan) 2025	Didn't qualify							
Total	0 Titles	7/19						

=== Europe U19 / U18 Championship ===
Champions Runners up Third place Fourth place

Europe U19 / U18 Championship
Year	Round	Position	Pld	W	L	SW	SL	Squad
(Spain) 1995	Didn't qualify							
(Slovakia) 1997		4th place						
(Poland) 1999		Third place						
(Czech Republic) 2001		6th place						
(Croatia) 2003		6th place						
(Latvia) 2005	Didn't qualify							
(Austria) 2007	Didn't qualify							
(Netherlands) 2009	Didn't qualify							
(Turkey) 2011	Didn't qualify							
(Bosnia and Herzegovina) / (Serbia) 2013	Didn't qualify							
(Turkey) 2015		7th place						
(Hungary) / (Slovakia) 2017		Champions						
(Czech Republic) / (Slovakia) 2018		Runners-up						
(Italy) 2020		Runners-up						
(Georgia (country)) 2022		7th place						
(Bulgaria) 2024		9th place						
(Italy) 2026		9th place						
Total	1 Title	11/17						

== Team ==
=== Current squad ===
The following players are the Czech players that have competed in the 2018 Boys' U18 Volleyball European Championship

#	name	position	height	weight	birthday	spike	block
	Balaz Radek	middle-blocker	202	85	2001	344	327
	Bambas Simon	libero	182	78	2002	320	305
	Drahonovsky Matous	outside-spiker	198	82	2001	338	322
	Dzavoronok Matyas	setter	197	89	2001	335	322
	Hendrich Tomas	opposite	194	87	2001	340	329
	Kaska Petr	middle-blocker	208	105	2001	343	328
	Kocvara Jakub	outside-spiker	191	82	2002	335	321
	Kopecky Tomas	setter	185	79	2001	328	317
	Krejci Jan	setter	193	82	2002	325	310
	Kubrycht Simon	libero	173	71	2001	302	294
	Medek Dominik	outside-spiker	197	79	2001	333	322
	Mika Jiri	libero	184	78	2001	318	309
	Mikulenka Jiri	opposite	190	81	2001	338	325
	Misek Tomas	setter	183	74	2001	321	309
	Spulak Petr	middle-blocker	198	92	2002	344	327
	Stanek Lubomir	middle-blocker	199	85	2002	339	325
	Toman Ladislav	outside-spiker	195	79	2001	329	315
	Unzeitig Ondrej	outside-spiker	193	79	2001	330	325
	Ures Filip	outside-spiker	186	82	2001	335	324
	Velat Ondrej	middle-blocker	194	78	2001	333	321
	Vodicka Jan	outside-spiker	200	85	2001	330	321
	Zavodsky Radim	opposite	198	85	2001	338	325
