= VC Yaroslavich =

VC Yaroslavich is a Russian men's volleyball club from Yaroslavl. Founded in 1988, until 2007 it was called Neftyanik (Нефтяник, "oilworkers").
