= Nigeria men's national under-19 volleyball team =

National sports team

Nigeria
- Association: Nigeria Volleyball Federation
- Head coach: Adekalu Adeniyi

Uniforms
Home

The Nigeria men's national under-19 volleyball teaam represents Nigeria in international men's under-19 volleyball competitions and friendly matches.

== Team achievements ==
The Nigeria Team won the under-19 Boys African National Volleyball Championship for 2021 and 2022 years on a row.

The team defeated Egypt in 2022 to clinch the trophy while the team defeated Morocco in 2021 to clinch the Trophy.

The Nigeria Team is the first Sub-Saharan Team to attend the FIVB Volleyball Men's Club World Championship twice.

The team won the 2018 African Youth Games title.

== Team Players ==
Some of the players that were involved in the African National Volleyball Championship in 2021 includes;

Pascal Ozokonye, Lawal Babatunde and Jeremiah Alexander.

Some outstanding players that featured in the African National Volleyball Championship in 2022 includes

Raheem Olayemi, Abdulaziz Aliyu and Elisha Anebi.
