= Brazil men's national under-19 volleyball team =

Men's national volleyball team representing Brazil

Brazil
- Association: CBV
- Confederation: CSV

Uniforms
Home	Away	Third

Youth Olympic Games
- Appearances: None

FIVB U19 World Championship
- Appearances: 15 (First in 1989)
- Best result: (gold) Champions : (1989, 1991, 1993, 1995, 2001, 2003)

The Brazil men's national under-19 volleyball team represents Brazil in international men's volleyball competitions and friendly matches under the age 19 and it is ruled by the Brazilian Volleyball Federation that is a member of South American volleyball body Confederación Sudamericana de Voleibol (CSV) and the international volleyball body government the Fédération Internationale de Volleyball (FIVB).

== Results ==
=== Summer Youth Olympics ===
Champions Runners up Third place Fourth place

Youth Olympic Games
Year	Round	Position	GP	MW	ML	SW	SL	Squad
(Singapore) 2010	Did not qualify							
Total	0 Titles	0/1	—	—	—	—	—	—

=== U19 World Championship ===
Champions Runners up Third place Fourth place

World Championship
Year	Round	Position	GP	MW	ML	SW	SL	Squad
(United Arab Emirates) 1989	Final	Champions	7	6	1	20	5	Squad
(Portugal) 1991	Final	Champions						Squad
(Turkey) 1993	Final	Champions						Squad
(Puerto Rico) 1995	Final	Champions						Squad
(Iran) 1997	Quarterfinals	5th Place	7	6	1	20	4	Squad
(Saudi Arabia) 1999	Quarterfinals	7th Place						Squad
(Egypt) 2001	Final	Champions	7	7	0	21	1	Squad
(Thailand) 2003	Final	Champions	6	5	1	16	6	Squad
(Algeria) 2005	Final	Runners Up	7	6	1	20	6	Squad
(Mexico) 2007	5th–8th semifinals	7th Place	8	4	4	15	14	Squad
(Italy) 2009	Group stage	9th Place	8	6	2	20	9	Squad
(Argentina) 2011	Group stage	9th Place	8	6	2	22	12	Squad
(Mexico) 2013	Quarterfinals	5th Place	8	7	1	21	7	Squad
(Argentina) 2015	Quarterfinals	6th Place	8	6	2	19	11	Squad
(Bahrain) 2017	Quarterfinals	8th Place	8	3	5	13	17	Squad
(Tunisia) 2019	Round of 16	9th Place	8	6	2	22	9	Squad
(Argentina) 2023	Round of 16	9th place	8	5	3	20	12	Squad
(Uzbekistan) 2025	Round of 16	10th place	8	5	4	15	14	Squad
Total	6 Titles	18/19	—	—	—	—	—	—

=== U19 South America Championship ===
Champions Runners up Third place Fourth place

South America Championship
Year	Round	Position	GP	MW	ML	SW	SL	Squad
(Argentina) 1978	Round Robin	Champions						—
(Brazil) 1980	Round Robin	Champions						—
(Paraguay) 1982	Round Robin	Champions						—
(Chile) 1984	Round Robin	Champions						—
(Peru) 1986	Round Robin	Champions						—
(Argentina) 1988	Round Robin	Champions						—
(Bolivia) 1990	Round Robin	Champions						—
(Venezuela) 1992	Round Robin	Champions						—
(Venezuela) 1994	Round Robin	Champions						—
(Paraguay) 1996	Round Robin	Champions						—
(Colombia) 1998	Round Robin	Champions						—
(Argentina) 2000	Round Robin	Champions						—
(Chile) 2002	Round Robin	Champions						—
(Colombia) 2004	Round Robin	Champions	5	5	0	15	2	—
(Argentina) 2006	Final	Champions	5	5	0	15	0	—
(Brazil) 2008	Final	Runners Up	5	4	1	13	3	—
(Venezuela) 2010	Round Robin	Runners Up	5	4	1	12	3	—
(Chile) 2012	Final	Champions	4	4	0	12	0	—
(Colombia) 2014	Final	Runners Up	4	3	1	9	5	—
(Peru) 2016	Final	Runners Up	4	3	1	9	4	—
(Colombia) 2018	Final	Champions	5	5	0	15	0	—
(Brazil) 2022	Final	Runners Up	4	3	1	9	4	—
(Brazil) 2024	Round Robin	Runners Up	4	3	1	11	4	—
Total	17 Titles	23/23	—	—	—	—	—	—

=== U19 Pan-American Cup ===
Champions Runners up Third place Fourth place

Pan-American Cup
Year	Round	Position	GP	MW	ML	SW	SL	Squad
(Mexico) 2011	Final	Champions	4	4	0	12	0	Squad
(Mexico) 2017	Did not Compete							
(Dominican Republic) 2019	Did not Compete							
Total	1 Titles	1/3	—	—	—	—	—	—

== Team ==
=== Current squad ===
Captain
Libero

The following is the Brazilian roster in the 2015 FIVB Volleyball Boys' U19 World Championship.

Head Coach: Percy Oncken

No.	Name	Date of birth	Height	Weight	Spike	Block	2015 club
1	Kaio Ribeiro	7 April 1997	1.92 m (6 ft 4 in)	78 kg (172 lb)	342 cm (135 in)	318 cm (125 in)	(Brazil) Maringá Volei
3	Fernando Pilan	27 August 1997	2.01 m (6 ft 7 in)	82 kg (181 lb)	332 cm (131 in)	318 cm (125 in)	(Brazil) Sesi-SP
7	Leonardo Almeida	25 January 1997	1.88 m (6 ft 2 in)	84 kg (185 lb)	312 cm (123 in)	336 cm (132 in)	(Brazil) Sesi-SP
9	Erick Costa (C)	29 June 1997	2.03 m (6 ft 8 in)	90 kg (200 lb)	340 cm (130 in)	318 cm (125 in)	(Brazil) Minas T.C.
10	Daniel Martins	5 June 1998	1.92 m (6 ft 4 in)	87 kg (192 lb)	333 cm (131 in)	310 cm (120 in)	(Brazil) Sesi-SP
11	Gabriel Bertolini	20 August 1997	1.99 m (6 ft 6 in)	93 kg (205 lb)	338 cm (133 in)	315 cm (124 in)	(Brazil) Sesi-SP
12	Jefferson Ferreira	3 July 1997	1.84 m (6 ft 0 in)	71 kg (157 lb)	331 cm (130 in)	310 cm (120 in)	(Brazil) Maringá Volei
13	Bruno Conte	6 July 1997	1.92 m (6 ft 4 in)	84 kg (185 lb)	333 cm (131 in)	307 cm (121 in)	(Brazil) Minas T.C.
15	Vitor Baesso	28 March 1998	1.98 m (6 ft 6 in)	91 kg (201 lb)	351 cm (138 in)	327 cm (129 in)	(Brazil) Sesi-SP
16	Lucas Araújo	24 June 1997	2.02 m (6 ft 8 in)	76 kg (168 lb)	336 cm (132 in)	324 cm (128 in)	(Brazil) Sesi-SP
17	Alexandre Figueiredo	30 September 1997	1.89 m (6 ft 2 in)	84 kg (185 lb)	323 cm (127 in)	306 cm (120 in)	(Brazil) Botafogo-RJ
20	Bernardo Assad	13 March 1998	1.88 m (6 ft 2 in)	83 kg (183 lb)	317 cm (125 in)	299 cm (118 in)	(Brazil) Sesi-SP

== Former squads ==
=== U19 World Championship ===
- 2003 — Gold medal
  Douglas Barbosa, Luiz Zech Coelho, Thiago Machado, Thiago Da Silva, Victor Goncalves, Fábio Paes, Breno Oliveira, Danilo Carvalho, Igor Braz Pinto, Moyses Junior, Silmar Almeida and Everaldo Silva
- 2005 — Silver medal
  Wanderson Campos, Guilherme Hage, Lucas de Jeus, Lucas Vieira, Alan Pinto, William Costa, Carlos Kalakauskas Junior, Carlos Faccin (c), Deivid Costa, José Santos Junior, Murilo Radke and Dhiego Gemi
- 2007 — 7th place
  Aurélio Figueiredo, Tiago Wesz, Levi Cabral, Maurício Silva, Murilo Radke (c), Guilherme Koepp, Najari Carvalho, Anderson Ventura, Renan Buiatti, Isac Santos, Rodrigo Menicucci and Thales Hoss
- 2009 — 9th place
  Marcelo Alves, Augusto Santos, Pedro Reck, Victor Hugo Pereira, Ary Neto, Eykman Silva, Otávio Pinto (c), Ricardo Lucarelli Souza, Guilherme Gentil, Renan Purificação, Thiago Araujo and Hugo Hamacher Silva
- 2011 — 9th place
  Alan Souza, Thiago Veloso (c), Rogério Filho, Felipe Hernandez, Jonatas Cardoso, Leandro Santos, João Ferreira, Flávio Gualberto, Alisson Melo, Tarcisio Guinter, Henrique Batagim and Wagner Silva
- 2013 — 5th place
  Fabio Rodrigues (c), Rodrigo Leão, Rogério Filho, Enrico Zappoli, Lindomar Jùnior, Leonardo Nascimento, Nicolas Santos, Jonatan Silva, Douglas Souza, Fernando Kreling, Douglas Bastos and Lucas Madaloz
- 2015 — 6th place
  Kaio Ribeiro, Fernando Rodrigues, Leonardo Cardoso, Erick Costa, Daniel Pinho (c), Gabriel Bertolini, Jefferson Souza, Bruno Conte, Vitor Baesso, Lucas Barreto, Alexandre Elias and Bernardo Westermann
- 2017 — 8th place
  Victor Cardoso, Bruno Ruivo, Carlos Henrique Silva, Gabriel Cotrim, Erick Hércio, André Saliba, Marcus Coelho, Guilherme Voss Santos, Arthur Nath, João Franck (c), João Vitor Santos and Welinton Oppenkoski
- 2019 — 9th place
  Darlan Souza, Gustavo Orlando (c), Lucas Lima da Silva, Rafael da Paz, Adriano Cavalcante, Paulo Vinicios da Silva, Nathan Krupp, Guilherme Rech, Leonardo Andrade, Pedro Tomasi, Otávio Brasil, and Leandro Campos Junior

== See also ==
- Brazil men's national volleyball team
- Brazil men's national under-23 volleyball team
- Brazil men's national under-21 volleyball team
- Brazil women's national under-23 volleyball team
- Brazil women's national under-20 volleyball team
- Brazil women's national under-18 volleyball team
