= Argentina men's national under-19 volleyball team =

Youth volleyball team representing Argentina

Argentina
- Association: Federación del Voleibol Argentino
- Confederation: CSV

Uniforms
| Home | Away |

Youth Olympic Games
- Appearances: 1 (First in 2010)
- Best result: (silver) Runners-Up : (2010)

FIVB U19 World Championship
- Appearances: 14 (First in 1989)
- Best result: (silver) Runners-Up : (2015)

South America U19 Championship
- Appearances: 22 (First in 1978)
- Best result: (gold) Gold : (2008, 2010, 2014, 2016, 2022, 2024).

The Argentina men's national under-19 volleyball team represents Argentina in men's under-19 volleyball events, it is controlled and managed by the Argentine Volleyball Federation that is a member of South American volleyball body Confederación Sudamericana de Voleibol (CSV) and the international volleyball body government the Fédération Internationale de Volleyball (FIVB).

== Results ==
=== Summer Youth Olympics ===
Champions Runners up Third place Fourth place

Youth Olympic Games
| Year | Round | Position | Pld | W | L | SW | SL | Squad |
|---|---|---|---|---|---|---|---|---|
| (Singapore) 2010 | | Runners-Up | | | | | | Squad |
| (China) 2014 | No Volleyball Event | | | | | | | |
| (Argentina) 2018 | No Volleyball Event | | | | | | | |
| Total | 0 Titles | 1/1 | | | | | | |

=== FIVB U19 World Championship ===
Champions Runners up Third place Fourth place

FIVB U19 World Championship
| Year | Round | Position | Pld | W | L | SW | SL | Squad |
|---|---|---|---|---|---|---|---|---|
| (United Arab Emirates) 1989 | | 7th place | | | | | | |
| (Portugal) 1991 | | 5th place | | | | | | |
| (Turkey) 1993 | Didn't qualify | | | | | | | |
| (Puerto Rico) 1995 | Didn't qualify | | | | | | | |
| (Iran) 1997 | Didn't qualify | | | | | | | |
| (Saudi Arabia) 1999 | Didn't qualify | | | | | | | |
| (Egypt) 2001 | | 9th place | | | | | | Squad |
| (Thailand) 2003 | Didn't qualify | | | | | | | |
| (Algeria) 2005 | | 4th place | | | | | | Squad |
| (Mexico) 2007 | | 4th place | | | | | | Squad |
| (Italy) 2009 | | Third place | | | | | | Squad |
| (Argentina) 2011 | | 5th place | | | | | | Squad |
| (Mexico) 2013 | | 6th place | | | | | | Squad |
| (Argentina) 2015 | | Runners-Up | | | | | | Squad |
| (Bahrain) 2017 | | 12th place | | | | | | Squad |
| (Tunisia) 2019 | | Third place | | | | | | Squad |
| (Iran) 2021 | | 5th place | | | | | | |
| (Argentina) 2023 | | 13th place | | | | | | |
| (Uzbekistan) 2025 | | 12th place | | | | | | |
| Total | 0 Titles | 14/19 | | | | | | |

=== South America U19 Championship ===
Champions Runners up Third place Fourth place

South America U19 Championship
| Year | Round | Position | Pld | W | L | SW | SL | Squad |
|---|---|---|---|---|---|---|---|---|
| (Argentina) 1978 | Final | Runners-Up | | | | | | Squad |
| (Brazil) 1980 | Final | Runners-Up | | | | | | Squad |
| (Paraguay) 1982 | Final | Runners-Up | | | | | | Squad |
| (Chile) 1984 | Final | Runners-Up | | | | | | Squad |
| (Peru) 1986 | Final | Runners-Up | | | | | | Squad |
| (Argentina) 1988 | Final | Runners-Up | | | | | | Squad |
| (Bolivia) 1990 | Final | Runners-Up | | | | | | Squad |
| (Venezuela) 1992 | Final | Runners-Up | | | | | | Squad |
| (Venezuela) 1994 | Didn't enter | | | | | | | |
| (Paraguay) 1996 | Semifinals | 4th place | | | | | | Squad |
| (Colombia) 1998 | Semifinals | 4th place | | | | | | Squad |
| (Argentina) 2000 | Semifinals | Third place | | | | | | Squad |
| (Chile) 2002 | Final | Runners-Up | | | | | | Squad |
| (Colombia) 2004 | Final | Runners-Up | | | | | | Squad |

South America U19 Championship
| Year | Round | Position | Pld | W | L | SW | SL | Squad |
|---|---|---|---|---|---|---|---|---|
| (Argentina) 2006 | Final | Runners-Up | | | | | | Squad |
| (Brazil) 2008 | Final | Champions | | | | | | Squad |
| (Venezuela) 2010 | Final | Champions | | | | | | Squad |
| (Chile) 2012 | Final | Runners-Up | | | | | | Squad |
| (Colombia) 2014 | Final | Champions | | | | | | Squad |
| (Peru) 2016 | Final | Champions | | | | | | Squad |
| (Colombia) 2018 | Final | Runners-up | | | | | | Squad |
| (Brazil) 2022 | Final | Champions | | | | | | Squad |
| (Brazil) 2024 | Round robin | Champions | | | | | | Squad |
| Total | 6 Titles | 22/23 | | | | | | |

=== Pan-American U19 Cup ===
Champions Runners up Third place Fourth place

Pan-American U19 Cup
| Year | Round | Position | Pld | W | L | SW | SL | Squad |
|---|---|---|---|---|---|---|---|---|
| (Mexico) 2011 | Didn't enter | | | | | | | |
| (Mexico) 2017 | Didn't enter | | | | | | | |
| Total | 0 Titles | 0/2 | | | | | | |

== Team ==
=== Current squad ===
The following is the Argentine roster in the 2015 FIVB Volleyball Boys' U19 World Championship.

Head Coach: Luis Testa

| No. | Name | Date of birth | Height | Weight | Spike | Block | 2015 club |
|---|---|---|---|---|---|---|---|
| 3 | Jan Martinez Franchi | 28 January 1998 | 1.91 m (6 ft 3 in) | 81 kg (179 lb) | 330 cm (130 in) | 315 cm (124 in) | (Argentina) Club Ciudad de Buenos Aires |
| 4 | Sergio Soria | 20 April 1997 | 1.96 m (6 ft 5 in) | 90 kg (200 lb) | 335 cm (132 in) | 315 cm (124 in) | (Argentina) Club Ciudad de Buenos Aires |
| 5 | Rodrigo Michelon | 17 August 1998 | 1.82 m (6 ft 0 in) | 72 kg (159 lb) | 320 cm (130 in) | 300 cm (120 in) | (Argentina) Club Atlético Boca Juniors |
| 6 | Ramiro Gazzaniga | 8 April 1997 | 1.78 m (5 ft 10 in) | 81 kg (179 lb) | 305 cm (120 in) | 290 cm (110 in) | (Argentina) Club Nautico Avellaneda |
| 7 | Matias Giraudo | 13 March 1998 | 1.96 m (6 ft 5 in) | 85 kg (187 lb) | 330 cm (130 in) | 315 cm (124 in) | (Argentina) Club Rivadavia |
| 9 | Felipe Benavidez (C) | 31 January 1997 | 1.92 m (6 ft 4 in) | 83 kg (183 lb) | 330 cm (130 in) | 302 cm (119 in) | (Argentina) Club de Amigos |
| 10 | Liam Arreche | 30 December 1997 | 1.94 m (6 ft 4 in) | 92 kg (203 lb) | 339 cm (133 in) | 320 cm (130 in) | (Argentina) Club de Amigos |
| 11 | Juan Bucciarelli | 26 November 1997 | 1.93 m (6 ft 4 in) | 86 kg (190 lb) | 336 cm (132 in) | 315 cm (124 in) | (Argentina) CO.DE.BA |
| 12 | Manuel Balague | 12 August 1998 | 1.90 m (6 ft 3 in) | 85 kg (187 lb) | 332 cm (131 in) | 317 cm (125 in) | (Argentina) Club Villa Dora |
| 13 | Agustín Loser | 12 October 1997 | 1.93 m (6 ft 4 in) | 77 kg (170 lb) | 335 cm (132 in) | 310 cm (120 in) | (Argentina) Club Ciudad de Buenos Aires |
| 14 | Jose Graffigna | 14 August 1997 | 1.86 m (6 ft 1 in) | 78 kg (172 lb) | 327 cm (129 in) | 305 cm (120 in) | (Argentina) Banco Hispano |
| 15 | Ignacio Roberts | 28 May 1997 | 1.82 m (6 ft 0 in) | 78 kg (172 lb) | 315 cm (124 in) | 295 cm (116 in) | (Argentina) Club Ciudad de Buenos Aires |
