= 2025 FIVB Volleyball Boys' U19 World Championship =

Volleyball competition in Uzbekistan

2025 FIVB voleybol bo'yicha 19 yoshgacha bo'lgan o'g'il bolalar o'rtasidagi jahon chempionati

Tournament details
- Host country: Uzbekistan
- City: Tashkent
- Dates: 24 July – 3 August
- Teams: 24 (from 5 confederations)
- Venues: 2 (in 1 host city)

Final positions
- Champions: France (2nd title)
- Runners-up: Poland
- Third place: Spain
- Fourth place: Iran

Tournament awards
- MVP: (France) Andrej Jokanovic
- Best Setter: (Poland) Maciej Drag
- Best OH: (France) Andrej Jokanovic; (France) Noa Duflos Rossi
- Best MB: (Poland) Tymoteusz Lenik; (France) Daniel Iyegbekedo
- Best OPP: (Spain) César Irache
- Best Libero: (France) Guillaume Respaut

The 2025 FIVB Volleyball Boys' U19 World Championship was the 19th edition of the FIVB Volleyball Boys' U19 World Championship, the biennial international youth volleyball championship contested by the men's national teams under the age of 19 of the members associations of the Fédération Internationale de Volleyball (FIVB), the sport's global governing body. It was held in Tashkent, Uzbekistan from 24 July to 3 August 2025.

Starting with this edition, the tournament was expanded from 20 to 24 teams, following the decision adopted by FIVB in June 2023.

== Host selection ==
On 28 March 2024, FIVB opened the bidding process for member associations whose countries were interested in hosting one of the four Age Group World Championships in 2025 (i.e., U19 Boys' and Girls' World Championships and U21 Men's and Women's World Championships). The expression of interest of the member associations had to be submitted to FIVB by 30 April 2024, 18:00 CEST (UTC+2).

FIVB announced the hosts for its four Age Group World Championship on 10 September 2024, with Uzbekistan being selected to host the 2025 Boys' U19 World Championship. This will be the first time that Uzbekistan will host an FIVB volleyball event in any category.

== Qualification ==
A total of 24 national teams qualified for the final tournament. In addition to the host Uzbekistan and defending champions France which qualified automatically, 20 other teams qualified through five separate continental competitions which had to be completed by 31 December 2024 at the latest. Two remaining teams entered the tournament via the Boys' U19 FIVB World Ranking (as of 24 September 2024) among the teams not yet qualified.

The slot allocation was set as follows:

- Defending champion (France): 1
- Host (Uzbekistan): 1
- AVC (Asia & Oceania): 4
- CAVB (Africa): 3
- CEV (Europe): 6
- CSV (South America): 3
- NORCECA (North, Central America and Caribbean): 4
- Top teams not yet qualified as per Boys' U19 FIVB World Ranking: 2

=== Qualified teams ===
The following twenty-four teams qualified for the tournament.

Confederation	Qualifying tournament	Team qualified	Appearances			Previous best performance
Confederation	Qualifying tournament	Team qualified	Total	First	Last	Previous best performance
AVC (Asia & Oceania)	Host nation	Uzbekistan	1	Debut		None
AVC (Asia & Oceania)	2024 Asian Men's U18 Championship ( (Bahrain) Manama, 28 July–4 August)	China	8	1999	2017	Runners-up (2007, 2013)
AVC (Asia & Oceania)	2024 Asian Men's U18 Championship ( (Bahrain) Manama, 28 July–4 August)	Iran	15	1989	2023	Champions (2007, 2017)
AVC (Asia & Oceania)	2024 Asian Men's U18 Championship ( (Bahrain) Manama, 28 July–4 August)	Pakistan	1	Debut		None
AVC (Asia & Oceania)	2024 Asian Men's U18 Championship ( (Bahrain) Manama, 28 July–4 August)	Japan	13	1989	2023	Runners-up (1993)
AVC (Asia & Oceania)	Boys' U19 FIVB World Ranking	South Korea	13	1989	2023	Third place (1991, 1993, 2023)
CAVB (Africa)	2024 Boys' U18 African Nations Championship ( (Tunisia) Tunis, 24–30 August)	Tunisia	12	1995	2019	Sixth place (2009)
CAVB (Africa)	2024 Boys' U18 African Nations Championship ( (Tunisia) Tunis, 24–30 August)	Egypt	15	1993	2023	Fourth place (2001, 2019)
CAVB (Africa)	2024 Boys' U18 African Nations Championship ( (Tunisia) Tunis, 24–30 August)	Algeria	6	1991	2013	Twelfth place (1991)
CEV (Europe)	Defending champions	France	15	1989	2023	Champions (2023)
CEV (Europe)	2024 Boys' U18 European Championship ( (Bulgaria) Plovdiv and Sofia, 10–21 July)	Italy	12	1995	2023	Champions (1997, 2019)
CEV (Europe)	2024 Boys' U18 European Championship ( (Bulgaria) Plovdiv and Sofia, 10–21 July)	Poland	13	1993	2021	Champions (2015, 2021)
CEV (Europe)	2024 Boys' U18 European Championship ( (Bulgaria) Plovdiv and Sofia, 10–21 July)	Spain	4	1985	2011	Runners-up (2011)
CEV (Europe)	2024 Boys' U18 European Championship ( (Bulgaria) Plovdiv and Sofia, 10–21 July)	Finland	3	1993	2013	Seventh place (1993)
CEV (Europe)	2024 Boys' U18 European Championship ( (Bulgaria) Plovdiv and Sofia, 10–21 July)	Belgium	6	2007	2023	Sixth place (2007, 2023)
CEV (Europe)	2024 Boys' U18 European Championship ( (Bulgaria) Plovdiv and Sofia, 10–21 July)	Turkey (Note: Turkey, the seventh-place best-ranked team at the 2024 European Boys' U18 Championship, qualifies as the next eligible nation since France, the defending World Champion, is already granted a spot in the competition.)	5	1993	2017	Ninth place (1993, 2015)
CEV (Europe)	Boys' U19 FIVB World Ranking	Bulgaria	9	1989	2023	Runners-up (2021)
CSV (South America)	2024 Boys' U19 South American Championship ( (Brazil) Araguari, 31 July–4 August)	Argentina	14	1989	2023	Runners-up (2015)
CSV (South America)	2024 Boys' U19 South American Championship ( (Brazil) Araguari, 31 July–4 August)	Brazil	19	1989	2023	Champions (1989, 1991, 1993, 1995, 2001, 2003)
CSV (South America)	2024 Boys' U19 South American Championship ( (Brazil) Araguari, 31 July–4 August)	Colombia	4	2019	2023	Fourteenth place (2023)
NORCECA (North, Central America and Caribbean)	2024 Boys' U19 NORCECA Continental Championship ( (Puerto Rico) Ponce, 14–19 May)	United States	10	1995	2023	Fourth place (2023)
NORCECA (North, Central America and Caribbean)	2024 Boys' U19 NORCECA Continental Championship ( (Puerto Rico) Ponce, 14–19 May)	Cuba	11	1991	2021	Third place (2011)
NORCECA (North, Central America and Caribbean)	2024 Boys' U19 NORCECA Continental Championship ( (Puerto Rico) Ponce, 14–19 May)	Puerto Rico	11	1989	2023	Fourth place (1995)
NORCECA (North, Central America and Caribbean)	2024 Boys' U19 NORCECA Continental Championship ( (Puerto Rico) Ponce, 14–19 May)	Canada	2	2005		Thirteenth place (2005)

== Pools composition ==
The draw was held on 4 December 2024, 13:30 UTC±0, at the FIVB headquarters in Lausanne, Switzerland. The 24 participating teams were split into four pools of six. The hosts Croatia and Serbia, defending champions United States and the top five teams of the Girls' U19 FIVB World Ranking (as of 24 September 2024) were seeded in the first two positions of each pool following the serpentine system. FIVB reserved the right to seed the host teams as heads of pools A and B regardless of their position in the World Ranking (with the highest ranked team as head of Pool A and next ranked team as head of Pool B). The remaining 16 non-seeded teams were allocated into four pots according to their position in the same Girls' U19 FIVB World Ranking, in order to be drawn to complete the following four positions in each pool.

=== Seeding ===
Boys' U19 FIVB World Ranking of each team as of 24 October 2022 are shown in brackets, except the hosts Uzbekistan who ranked 58th.

Seeded teams		Unseeded teams to be drawn			
Line 1	Line 2	Pot 1 (line 3)	Pot 2 (line 4)	Pot 3 (line 5)	Pot 4 (line 6)
Uzbekistan (Hosts, assigned to A1); France (1), assigned to B1; Iran (2), assigned to C1; United States (3), assigned to D1	South Korea (4), assigned to D2; Italy (5), assigned to C2; Bulgaria (6), assigned to B2; Belgium (7), assigned to A2	Egypt (8); Brazil (9); Argentina (10); Japan (11)	Colombia (12); Puerto Rico (13); Tunisia (14); China (14)	Cuba (16); Algeria (19); Poland (19); Pakistan (19)	Spain (22); Canada (22); Finland (26); Turkey (31)

=== Draw ===
The draw procedure for the pools composition also followed the serpentine system and was as follows:

- Teams from pot 4 were drawn first and were placed in line 6 of each pool starting from pool D to pool A.
- Teams from pot 3 were then drawn and placed in line 5 of each pool starting from pool A to pool D.
- Teams from pot 2 were then drawn and placed in line 4 of each pool starting from pool D to pool A.
- Teams from pot 1 were drawn at the end and were placed in line 3 of each pool starting from pool A to pool D.

The pools composition after the draw was as follow:

Pool A
Pos	Team
A1	Uzbekistan
A2	Belgium
A3	Argentina
A4	Puerto Rico
A5	Pakistan
A6	Turkey

Pool B
Pos	Team
B1	France
B2	Bulgaria
B3	Japan
B4	China
B5	Algeria
B6	Canada

Pool C
Pos	Team
C1	Iran
C2	Italy
C3	Egypt
C4	Tunisia
C5	Poland
C6	Spain

Pool D
Pos	Team
D1	United States
D2	South Korea
D3	Brazil
D4	Colombia
D5	Cuba
D6	Finland

== Venues ==
On 11 October 2024, FIVB confirmed Tashkent as the host city. The competition is entirely played at the Saxovat Sport Servis sport complex located in the Yunusabad district.

== Competition format and changes ==
In June 2023 during a three-day meeting in Punta Cana, Dominican Republic, the FIVB Board of Administration approved the proposal made by its Volleyball Council to increase the number of participating teams to 24 in its Age Group World Championships (U19 and U21 in both genders). Consequently, the distribution of quotas by confederation for the Boys' U19 World Championship was modified regarding previous editions, ensuring one automatic quota for the defending champion and assigning two quotas based on the corresponding FIVB Age Group World Ranking.

The new competition format is in line with the one adopted for the 2023 FIVB Volleyball Girls' U19 World Championship. The 24 teams were split into four single round-robin pools of six with the top four teams from each pool advancing to the round of 16, while the ramaining two teams continuing their participation in the playoffs for places from 17th to 24th. The round of 16 winners advances to the quarter-finals, while the losers continue their participation in the playoffs for places from 9th to 16th. Finally, the 24 teams go through another three rounds: quarter-finals, semi-finals and finals for each team's final placement level (17th–24th, 9th–16th and 1st–8th).

=== Pool standing procedure ===
The ranking of teams in the preliminary round was established according the following criteria:

1. Total number of victories (matches won, matches lost);
2. Match points;
  - Match won 3–0 or 3–1: 3 points for the winner, 0 points for the loser
  - Match won 3–2: 2 points for the winner, 1 point for the loser
  - Match forfeited: 3 points for the winner, 0 points (0–25, 0–25, 0–25) for the loser
3. Sets ratio;
4. Points ratio;
5. If the tie continues between two teams: result of the last match between the tied teams. If the tie continues between three or more teams: a new classification would be made taking into consideration only the matches involving the teams in question.

== Squads ==
Each national team had to register a long-list roster with up to 25 players, which eventually had to be reduced to a final list of 12 players. Players born on or after 1 January 2007 were eligible to compete in the tournament.

== Preliminary round ==
- All times are Uzbekistan Time (UTC+05:00).

=== Pool A ===
Pos	Team	Pld	W	L	Pts	SW	SL	SR	SPW	SPL	SPR	Qualification
1	Pakistan	5	4	1	13	14	3	4.667	401	335	1.197	Round of 16
2	Belgium	5	4	1	11	12	6	2.000	409	353	1.159	Round of 16
3	Argentina	5	4	1	11	14	8	1.750	485	455	1.066	Round of 16
4	Uzbekistan (H)	5	2	3	6	7	9	0.778	338	356	0.949	Round of 16
5	Turkey	5	1	4	4	6	12	0.500	368	421	0.874	17th–24th places
6	Puerto Rico	5	0	5	0	0	15	0.000	297	378	0.786	17th–24th places

Source: FIVB Boys' U19 World Championship 2025 - Standings
Rules for classification: Pool standing procedure
(H) Host

Date	Time		Score		Set 1	Set 2	Set 3	Set 4	Set 5	Total	Attd	Report
24 Jul	11:00	Belgium	0–3	Pakistan	19–25	17–25	22–25			58–75	278	P2 Report
24 Jul	14:00	Argentina	3–0	Puerto Rico	25–19	25–21	25–23			75–63	1,258	P2 Report
24 Jul	17:00	Uzbekistan	3–0	Turkey	25–22	25–19	25–17			75–58	2,000	P2 Report
25 Jul	11:00	Belgium	3–0	Puerto Rico	25–21	25–21	25–16			75–58	280	P2 Report
25 Jul	14:00	Argentina	3–2	Turkey	21–25	25–23	25–22	22–25	15–12	108–107	300	P2 Report
25 Jul	17:00	Uzbekistan	0–3	Pakistan	23–25	18–25	21–25			62–75	2,053	P2 Report
26 Jul	11:00	Pakistan	3–0	Turkey	25–17	25–19	25–19			75–55	150	P2 Report
26 Jul	14:00	Belgium	3–2	Argentina	24–26	17–25	25–21	25–18	15–12	106–102	100	P2 Report
26 Jul	17:00	Uzbekistan	3–0	Puerto Rico	25–18	25–21	25–14			75–53	2,028	P2 Report
28 Jul	11:00	Belgium	3–1	Turkey	25–14	20–25	25–19	25–12		95–70	250	P2 Report
28 Jul	14:00	Puerto Rico	0–3	Pakistan	20–25	20–25	15–25			55–75	225	P2 Report
28 Jul	17:00	Uzbekistan	1–3	Argentina	19–25	25–20	19–25	15–25		78–95	2,100	P2 Report
29 Jul	11:00	Argentina	3–2	Pakistan	24–26	25–18	25–21	16–25	15–11	105–101	250	P2 Report
29 Jul	14:00	Puerto Rico	0–3	Turkey	20–25	26–28	22–25			68–78	265	P2 Report
29 Jul	17:00	Uzbekistan	0–3	Belgium	14–25	16–25	18–25			48–75	2,037	P2 Report

=== Pool B ===
Pos	Team	Pld	W	L	Pts	SW	SL	SR	SPW	SPL	SPR	Qualification
1	Bulgaria	5	4	1	12	12	5	2.400	406	364	1.115	Round of 16
2	France	5	4	1	12	14	6	2.333	491	425	1.155	Round of 16
3	China	5	4	1	11	13	5	2.600	431	389	1.108	Round of 16
4	Japan	5	2	3	7	9	10	0.900	447	440	1.016	Round of 16
5	Algeria	5	1	4	3	3	13	0.231	313	400	0.783	17th–24th places
6	Canada	5	0	5	0	3	15	0.200	381	451	0.845	17th–24th places

Source: FIVB Boys' U19 World Championship 2025 - Standings
Rules for classification: Pool standing procedure

Date	Time		Score		Set 1	Set 2	Set 3	Set 4	Set 5	Total	Attd	Report
24 Jul	11:00	France	3–1	Canada	22–25	25–22	25–20	25–20		97–87	ND	P2 Report
24 Jul	14:00	Bulgaria	3–0	Algeria	25–17	25–17	25–19			75–53	200	P2 Report
24 Jul	17:00	Japan	0–3	China	25–27	26–28	15–25			66–80	ND	P2 Report
25 Jul	11:00	France	3–0	Algeria	25–16	25–14	25–14			75–44	225	P2 Report
25 Jul	14:00	Bulgaria	3–1	China	25–17	25–23	22–25	25–19		97–84	ND	P2 Report
25 Jul	17:00	Japan	3–1	Canada	27–29	25–11	25–23	25–20		102–83	300	P2 Report
26 Jul	11:00	France	2–3	China	35–37	22–25	25–20	25–20	12–15	119–117	ND	P2 Report
26 Jul	14:00	Bulgaria	3–1	Japan	25–23	27–25	20–25	25–16		97–89	ND	P2 Report
26 Jul	17:00	Algeria	3–1	Canada	19–25	28–26	30–28	25–21		102–100	175	P2 Report
28 Jul	11:00	France	3–2	Japan	33–35	23–25	25–21	25–19	17–15	123–115	ND	P2 Report
28 Jul	14:00	Bulgaria	3–0	Canada	25–17	25–23	25–21			75–61	ND	P2 Report
28 Jul	17:00	China	3–0	Algeria	25–21	25–16	25–20			75–57	200	P2 Report
29 Jul	11:00	France	3–0	Bulgaria	25–18	27–25	25–19			77–62	ND	P2 Report
29 Jul	14:00	Japan	3–0	Algeria	25–18	25–21	25–18			75–57	ND	P2 Report
29 Jul	17:00	China	3–0	Canada	25–20	25–17	25–13			75–50	150	P2 Report

=== Pool C ===
Pos	Team	Pld	W	L	Pts	SW	SL	SR	SPW	SPL	SPR	Qualification
1	Italy	5	4	1	13	14	5	2.800	471	388	1.214	Round of 16
2	Spain	5	4	1	11	13	7	1.857	472	431	1.095	Round of 16
3	Iran	5	3	2	9	12	8	1.500	438	420	1.043	Round of 16
4	Poland	5	3	2	9	12	8	1.500	437	422	1.036	Round of 16
5	Egypt	5	1	4	3	4	12	0.333	340	396	0.859	17th–24th places
6	Tunisia	5	0	5	0	0	15	0.000	282	383	0.736	17th–24th places

Source: FIVB Boys' U19 World Championship 2025 - Standings
Rules for classification: Pool standing procedure

Date	Time		Score		Set 1	Set 2	Set 3	Set 4	Set 5	Total	Attd	Report
24 Jul	11:00	Iran	2–3	Spain	22–25	25–20	23–25	25–21	12–15	107–106	350	P2 Report
24 Jul	14:00	Egypt	3–0	Tunisia	25–18	30–28	28–26			83–72	185	P2 Report
24 Jul	17:00	Italy	2–3	Poland	25–20	22–25	22–25	25–14	18–20	112–104	250	P2 Report
25 Jul	11:00	Iran	3–2	Poland	25–22	25–14	17–25	14–25	15–13	96–99	199	P2 Report
25 Jul	14:00	Egypt	1–3	Spain	20–25	25–23	16–25	20–25		81–98	200	P2 Report
25 Jul	17:00	Italy	3–0	Tunisia	25–18	25–13	25–14			75–45	41	P2 Report
26 Jul	11:00	Iran	3–0	Tunisia	25–20	25–15	25–20			75–55	150	P2 Report
26 Jul	14:00	Poland	1–3	Spain	19–25	17–25	25–20	22–25		83–95	280	P2 Report
26 Jul	17:00	Italy	3–0	Egypt	25–19	25–19	25–18			75–56	150	P2 Report
28 Jul	11:00	Iran	3–0	Egypt	25–16	25–22	25–20			75–58	50	P2 Report
28 Jul	14:00	Tunisia	0–3	Poland	19–25	21–25	17–25			57–75	75	P2 Report
28 Jul	17:00	Italy	3–1	Spain	22–25	31–29	25–17	29–27		107–98	300	P2 Report
29 Jul	11:00	Egypt	0–3	Poland	24–26	17–25	21–25			62–76	105	P2 Report
29 Jul	14:00	Tunisia	0–3	Spain	14–25	19–25	20–25			53–75	100	P2 Report
29 Jul	17:00	Iran	1–3	Italy	16–25	28–26	24–26	17–25		85–102	465	P2 Report

=== Pool D ===
Pos	Team	Pld	W	L	Pts	SW	SL	SR	SPW	SPL	SPR	Qualification
1	Finland	5	5	0	14	15	4	3.750	446	395	1.129	Round of 16
2	South Korea	5	3	2	10	12	6	2.000	429	388	1.106	Round of 16
3	Brazil	5	3	2	9	9	6	1.500	348	334	1.042	Round of 16
4	United States	5	3	2	8	10	10	1.000	457	444	1.029	Round of 16
5	Colombia	5	1	4	3	6	14	0.429	396	467	0.848	17th–24th places
6	Cuba	5	0	5	1	3	15	0.200	371	419	0.885	17th–24th places

Source: FIVB Boys' U19 World Championship 2025 - Standings
Rules for classification: Pool standing procedure

Date	Time		Score		Set 1	Set 2	Set 3	Set 4	Set 5	Total	Attd	Report
24 Jul	20:00	United States	1–3	Finland	25–17	17–25	21–25	20–25		83–92	306	P2 Report
24 Jul	20:00	Brazil	3–0	Colombia	25–17	25–21	25–15			75–53	100	P2 Report
24 Jul	20:00	South Korea	3–0	Cuba	25–21	25–20	25–20			75–61	277	P2 Report
25 Jul	20:00	South Korea	3–0	Colombia	25–18	25–23	25–17			75–58	431	P2 Report
25 Jul	20:00	United States	3–1	Cuba	17–25	25–19	25–15	25–21		92–80	200	P2 Report
25 Jul	20:00	Brazil	0–3	Finland	22–25	18–25	22–25			62–75	100	P2 Report
26 Jul	20:00	South Korea	3–0	Brazil	25–16	25–21	25–22			75–59	324	P2 Report
26 Jul	20:00	Cuba	0–3	Finland	23–25	20–25	15–25			58–75	225	P2 Report
26 Jul	20:00	United States	3–2	Colombia	25–19	19–25	25–18	30–32	15–9	114–103	400	P2 Report
28 Jul	20:00	Colombia	3–2	Cuba	26–24	25–18	16–25	17–25	16–14	100–106	400	P2 Report
28 Jul	20:00	United States	0–3	Brazil	21–25	22–25	22–25			65–75	ND	P2 Report
28 Jul	20:00	South Korea	2–3	Finland	20–25	25–14	25–20	19–25	21–23	110–107	400	P2 Report
29 Jul	20:00	Colombia	1–3	Finland	25–22	21–25	15–25	21–25		82–97	279	P2 Report
29 Jul	20:00	United States	3–1	South Korea	25–27	28–26	25–22	25–19		103–94	500	P2 Report
29 Jul	20:00	Brazil	3–0	Cuba	25–18	27–25	25–23			77–66	150	P2 Report

== Final round ==
- All times are Uzbekistan Time (UTC+05:00).

=== 17th–24th places ===
21st place match
2 August
Tunisia	0
Egypt	3
23rd place match
2 August
Algeria	0
Canada	3

21st–24th semifinals
1 August
Tunisia	3
Algeria	2
1 August
Egypt	3
Canada	0

17th–24th quarterfinals
30 July
Turkey	3
Tunisia	2
30 July
Algeria	0
Cuba	3
30 July
Egypt	0
Puerto Rico	3
30 July
Colombia	3
Canada	1

17th–20th semifinals
1 August
Turkey	0
Cuba	3
1 August
Puerto Rico	3
Colombia	1

17th place match
2 August
Cuba	3
Puerto Rico	0
19th place match
2 August
Turkey	2
Colombia	3

==== 17th–24th quarterfinals ====
Date	Time		Score		Set 1	Set 2	Set 3	Set 4	Set 5	Total	Attd	Report
30 Jul	11:00	Turkey	3–2	Tunisia	24–26	25–22	25–16	22–25	15–12	111–101	123	P2 Report
30 Jul	11:00	Egypt	0–3	Puerto Rico	23–25	22–25	15–25			60–75	40	P2 Report
30 Jul	17:00	Algeria	0–3	Cuba	19–25	23–25	12–25			54–75	50	P2 Report
30 Jul	20:00	Colombia	3–1	Canada	17–25	25–23	26–24	25–22		93–94	100	P2 Report

==== 21st–24th semifinals ====
Date	Time		Score		Set 1	Set 2	Set 3	Set 4	Set 5	Total	Attd	Report
1 Aug	11:00	Tunisia	3–2	Algeria	25–19	28–30	21–25	25–17	15–7	114–98	55	P2 Report
1 Aug	14:00	Egypt	3–0	Canada	25–22	25–16	25–20			75–58	65	P2 Report

==== 17th–20th semifinals ====
Date	Time		Score		Set 1	Set 2	Set 3	Set 4	Set 5	Total	Attd	Report
1 Aug	17:00	Turkey	0–3	Cuba	22–25	18–25	21–25			61–75	250	P2 Report
1 Aug	20:00	Puerto Rico	3–1	Colombia	25–17	24–26	25–20	25–21		99–84	53	P2 Report

==== 23rd place match ====
Date	Time		Score		Set 1	Set 2	Set 3	Set 4	Set 5	Total	Attd	Report
2 Aug	11:00	Algeria	0–3	Canada	21–25	21–25	28–30			70–80	104	P2 Report

==== 21st place match ====
Date	Time		Score		Set 1	Set 2	Set 3	Set 4	Set 5	Total	Attd	Report
2 Aug	14:00	Tunisia	0–3	Egypt	18–25	18–25	21–25			57–75	50	P2 Report

==== 19th place match ====
Date	Time		Score		Set 1	Set 2	Set 3	Set 4	Set 5	Total	Attd	Report
2 Aug	14:00	Turkey	2–3	Colombia	25–20	22–25	25–20	23–25	12–15	107–105	42	P2 Report

==== 17th place match ====
Date	Time		Score		Set 1	Set 2	Set 3	Set 4	Set 5	Total	Attd	Report
2 Aug	20:00	Cuba	3–0	Puerto Rico	25–23	25–22	25–20			75–65	55	P2 Report

=== 1st–16th places ===
9th place match
3 August
China	3
Brazil	0
11th place match
3 August
Argentina	1
Belgium	3
13th place match
3 August
Pakistan	3
Uzbekistan	0
15th place match
3 August
United States	3
Japan	2

9th–12th semifinals
2 August
China	3
Argentina	2
2 August
Brazil	3
Belgium	1
13th–16th semifinals
2 August
Pakistan	3
United States	1
2 August
Uzbekistan	3
Japan	1

9th–16th quarterfinals
1 August
Pakistan	0
China	3
1 August
Argentina	3
United States	2
1 August
Uzbekistan	1
Brazil	3
1 August
Belgium	3
Japan	2

Round of 16
30 July
Pakistan	2
Poland	3
30 July
South Korea	3
China	0
30 July
Spain	3
Argentina	0
30 July
Bulgaria	3
United States	2
30 July
Italy	3
Uzbekistan	0
30 July
France	3
Brazil	0
30 July
Belgium	1
Iran	3
30 July
Finland	3
Japan	0

Quarterfinals
1 August
Poland	3
South Korea	2
1 August
Spain	3
Bulgaria	2
1 August
Italy	1
France	3
1 August
Iran	3
Finland	1

Semifinals
2 August
Poland	3
Spain	0
2 August
France	3
Iran	1
5th–8th semifinals
2 August
South Korea	0
Bulgaria	3
2 August
Italy	3
Finland	0

Final
3 August
Poland	1
France	3
3rd place match
3 August
Spain	3
Iran	2
5th place match
3 August
Bulgaria	1
Italy	3
7th place match
3 August
South Korea	1
Finland	3

==== Round of 16 ====
Date	Time		Score		Set 1	Set 2	Set 3	Set 4	Set 5	Total	Attd	Report
30 Jul	11:00	Spain	3–0	Argentina	25–22	25–23	27–25			77–70	183	P2 Report
30 Jul	14:00	Pakistan	2–3	Poland	25–21	23–25	25–17	21–25	16–18	110–106	225	P2 Report
30 Jul	14:00	Bulgaria	3–2	United States	25–22	25–23	20–25	14–25	16–14	100–109	ND	P2 Report
30 Jul	14:00	South Korea	3–0	China	25–22	25–19	25–22			75–63	200	P2 Report
30 Jul	17:00	Italy	3–0	Uzbekistan	25–18	25–14	25–14			75–46	1,700	P2 Report
30 Jul	17:00	France	3–0	Brazil	25–18	25–22	25–21			75–61	300	P2 Report
30 Jul	20:00	Belgium	1–3	Iran	19–25	25–17	19–25	20–25		83–92	756	P2 Report
30 Jul	20:00	Finland	3–0	Japan	25–22	27–25	25–21			77–68	350	P2 Report

==== 9th–16th quarterfinals ====
Date	Time		Score		Set 1	Set 2	Set 3	Set 4	Set 5	Total	Attd	Report
1 Aug	11:00	Pakistan	0–3	China	19–25	18–25	18–25			55–75	ND	P2 Report
1 Aug	14:00	Argentina	3–2	United States	22–25	25–21	21–25	25–20	15–9	108–100	ND	P2 Report
1 Aug	17:00	Uzbekistan	1–3	Brazil	13–25	25–23	15–25	18–25		71–98	500	P2 Report
1 Aug	20:00	Belgium	3–2	Japan	18–25	42–40	25–21	21–25	15–11	121–122	154	P2 Report

==== Quarterfinals ====
Date	Time		Score		Set 1	Set 2	Set 3	Set 4	Set 5	Total	Attd	Report
1 Aug	11:00	Poland	3–2	South Korea	25–17	24–26	27–25	19–25	15–13	110–106	450	P2 Report
1 Aug	14:00	Spain	3–2	Bulgaria	24–26	19–25	25–17	25–17	15–8	108–93	400	P2 Report
1 Aug	17:00	Italy	1–3	France	22–25	25–21	30–32	18–25		95–103	790	P2 Report
1 Aug	20:00	Iran	3–1	Finland	30–28	21–25	25–16	25–20		101–89	520	P2 Report

==== 13th–16th semifinals ====
Date	Time		Score		Set 1	Set 2	Set 3	Set 4	Set 5	Total	Attd	Report
2 Aug	11:00	Pakistan	3–1	United States	25–14	22–25	25–18	25–23		97–80	200	P2 Report
2 Aug	17:00	Uzbekistan	3–1	Japan	14–25	25–21	25–21	25–14		89–81	500	P2 Report

==== 9th–12th semifinals ====
Date	Time		Score		Set 1	Set 2	Set 3	Set 4	Set 5	Total	Attd	Report
2 Aug	17:00	China	3–2	Argentina	21–25	23–25	25–20	35–33	15–13	119–116	100	P2 Report
2 Aug	20:00	Brazil	3–1	Belgium	20–25	25–20	25–16	25–16		95–77	150	P2 Report

==== 5th–8th semifinals ====
Date	Time		Score		Set 1	Set 2	Set 3	Set 4	Set 5	Total	Attd	Report
2 Aug	11:00	South Korea	0–3	Bulgaria	17–25	23–25	21–25			61–75	175	P2 Report
2 Aug	14:00	Italy	3–0	Finland	25–19	25–20	25–23			75–62	325	P2 Report

==== Semifinals ====
Date	Time		Score		Set 1	Set 2	Set 3	Set 4	Set 5	Total	Attd	Report
2 Aug	17:00	Poland	3–0	Spain	25–16	25–16	25–20			75–52	552	P2 Report
2 Aug	20:00	France	3–1	Iran	14–25	25–14	25–22	25–19		89–80	950	P2 Report

==== 15th place match ====
Date	Time		Score		Set 1	Set 2	Set 3	Set 4	Set 5	Total	Attd	Report
3 Aug	10:00	United States	3–2	Japan	20–25	25–16	25–15	23–25	15–12	108–93	38	P2 Report

==== 13th place match ====
Date	Time		Score		Set 1	Set 2	Set 3	Set 4	Set 5	Total	Attd	Report
3 Aug	11:00	Pakistan	3–0	Uzbekistan	25–18	25–19	25–18			75–55	2,100	P2 Report

==== 11th place match ====
Date	Time		Score		Set 1	Set 2	Set 3	Set 4	Set 5	Total	Attd	Report
3 Aug	13:00	Argentina	1–3	Belgium	19–25	23–25	26–24	19–25		87–99	50	P2 Report

==== 9th place match ====
Date	Time		Score		Set 1	Set 2	Set 3	Set 4	Set 5	Total	Attd	Report
3 Aug	13:00	China	3–0	Brazil	27–25	25–21	26–24			78–70	55	P2 Report

==== 7th place match ====
Date	Time		Score		Set 1	Set 2	Set 3	Set 4	Set 5	Total	Attd	Report
3 Aug	10:00	South Korea	1–3	Finland	19–25	21–25	25–21	21–25		86–96	50	P2 Report

==== 5th place match ====
Date	Time		Score		Set 1	Set 2	Set 3	Set 4	Set 5	Total	Attd	Report
3 Aug	16:00	Bulgaria	1–3	Italy	25–21	19–25	19–25	20–25		83–96	100	P2 Report

==== 3rd place match ====
Date	Time		Score		Set 1	Set 2	Set 3	Set 4	Set 5	Total	Attd	Report
3 Aug	14:00	Spain	3–2	Iran	23–25	25–23	15–25	25–21	15–10	103–104	1,000	P2 Report

==== Final ====
Date	Time		Score		Set 1	Set 2	Set 3	Set 4	Set 5	Total	Attd	Report
3 Aug	17:00	Poland	1–3	France	25–22	22–25	15–25	12–25		74–97	2,375	P2 Report

== Final standing ==
Rank	Team
1st place, gold medalist(s)	France
2nd place, silver medalist(s)	Poland
3rd place, bronze medalist(s)	Spain
4	Iran
5	Italy
6	Bulgaria
7	Finland
8	South Korea
9	China
10	Brazil
11	Belgium
12	Argentina
13	Pakistan
14	Uzbekistan
15	United States
16	Japan
17	Cuba
18	Puerto Rico
19	Colombia
20	Turkey
21	Egypt
22	Tunisia
23	Canada
24	Algeria

Qualified for the 2027 World Championship

2025 Men's U21 World champions

France
Second title

14–boy roster
Pierre Delaporte, Théo Martzluff, Ino Dukic, Thomas Schmitz-Straumann, Guillaume Respaut, Andrej Jokanovic, Viden Natzev, William Laplace, Sadjhy Crane, Adelin Nowaczyk, Daniel Iyegbekedo, Noa Duflos Rossi (c)
Head coach
Jean-Manuel Leprovost

== Awards ==
The following individual awards were presented at the end of the tournament.

- Most valuable player
  (France) Andrej Jokanovic
- Best setter
  (Poland) Maciej Drąg
- Best outside spikers
  (France) Andrej Jokanovic
  (France) Noa Duflos Rossi
- Best middle blockers
  (Poland) Tymoteusz Lenik
  (France) Daniel Iyegbekedo
- Best opposite spiker
  (Spain) César Irache
- Best libero
  (France) Guillaume Respaut

== Statistics leaders ==
The statistics of leaders for each skill are recorded throughout the tournament.

Best Scorers
Rank	Player	Attacks	Blocks	Serves	Total
1	(Spain) César Irache	208	11	11	231
2	(Japan) Karen Masajedi	184	7	11	197
3	(Poland) Maksymilian Łysoń	171	14	7	191
4	(United States) Grant Lamoureux	149	15	16	177
5	(Colombia) Maicol Ortiz	138	22	11	166

Best Attackers
Rank	Player	Spikes	Faults	Shots	%	Total
1	(Spain) César Irache	208	83	157	46.43	448
2	(Japan) Karen Masajedi	184	86	121	47.06	391
3	(Poland) Maksymilian Łysoń	171	54	67	58.56	292
4	(United States) Grant Lamoureux	149	56	113	46.86	318
5	(Belgium) Guilhem Hubert	142	60	107	45.95	309

Best Blockers
Rank	Player	Blocks	Faults	Rebounds	Avg	Total
1	(Pakistan) Muhammad Saud	33	42	48	3.67	123
2	(Iran) Mohammad Nima Bateni	31	48	56	3.44	135
3	(United States) Roman Payne	29	30	35	3.22	94
4	(Poland) Tymoteusz Lenik	26	43	43	2.89	112
5	(Belgium) Tuur Vanbroekhoven	24	35	45	2.67	104
5	(Argentina) Iván Pavón	24	41	38	2.67	103

Best Servers
Rank	Player	Aces	Faults	Hits	Avg	Total
1	(South Korea) Bang Kang-ho	21	24	107	2.33	152
2	(France) Andrej Jokanovic	16	23	117	1.78	156
3	(Turkey) İsmail Ayrancı	14	11	55	1.75	80
4	(Belgium) Guilhem Hubert	13	30	95	1.44	138
4	(United States) Grant Lamoureux	13	43	86	1.44	142

Best Setters
Rank	Player	Running	Faults	Still	Avg	Total
1	(Pakistan) Abu Bakar Siddique	295	8	401	32.78	704
2	(Poland) Maciej Drąg	293	5	329	32.56	627
3	(France) Théo Martzluff	272	3	513	30.22	788
4	(Iran) Arshia Saedati	266	6	401	29.56	673
5	(Spain) Ernesto Gómez	246	3	633	27.33	882

Best Diggers
Rank	Player	Digs	Faults	Receptions	Avg	Total
1	(Japan) Ryota Nakayama	116	36	54	12.89	206
2	(Canada) Parker Ocampo	99	20	20	12.38	139
3	(Argentina) Valentín Yapura	98	44	49	10.89	191
4	(Belgium) Thomas Neyens	89	28	36	9.89	153
5	(Pakistan) Khizar Hayat	88	33	38	9.78	159
5	(United States) Layton Bluth	88	24	38	9.78	150

Best Receivers
Rank	Player	Excellents	Faults	Serve	%	Total
1	(Spain) Mario García	71	10	156	29.96	237
2	(United States) Layton Bluth	66	13	133	31.13	212
3	(Iran) Mahdi Sakhavi	64	6	133	31.53	203
4	(France) Andrej Jokanovic	61	7	186	24.02	218
4	(South Korea) Bang Kang-ho	61	9	148	27.98	271

== See also ==
- 2025 FIVB Volleyball Girls' U19 World Championship
- 2025 FIVB Volleyball Men's U21 World Championship
- 2025 FIVB Men's Volleyball World Championship
