= Finland men's national under-19 volleyball team =

Youth volleyball team representing Finland

Finland Boys' U19
- Association: Finnish Volleyball Federation
- Confederation: CEV

Uniforms
Home	Away	Third

FIVB U19 World Championship
- Appearances: 3 (First in 1993)
- Best result: 7th place : (1993)

Europe U19 / U18 Championship
- Appearances: 4 (First in 1997)
- Best result: 4th place : (2013)
- www.lentopalloliitto.fi/en (in English)

The Finland men's national under-19 volleyball team represents Finland in international men's volleyball competitions and friendly matches under the age 19 and it is ruled by the Finnish Volleyball Federation body that is an affiliate of the Federation of International Volleyball FIVB and also part of the European Volleyball Confederation CEV.

== Results ==
=== Summer Youth Olympics ===
Champions Runners up Third place Fourth place

Youth Olympic Games
Year	Round	Position	Pld	W	L	SW	SL	Squad
(Singapore) 2010	Didn't qualify							
(China) 2014	No Volleyball Event							
(Argentina) 2018	No Volleyball Event							
(Senegal) 2026	No Volleyball Event							
Total	0 Titles	0/1						

=== FIVB U19 World Championship ===
Champions Runners up Third place Fourth place

FIVB U19 World Championship
Year	Round	Position	Pld	W	L	SW	SL	Squad
(United Arab Emirates) 1989	Didn't qualify							
(Portugal) 1991	Didn't qualify							
(Turkey) 1993		7th place						
(Puerto Rico) 1995	Didn't qualify							
(Iran) 1997		13th place						
(Saudi Arabia) 1999	Didn't qualify							
(Egypt) 2001	Didn't qualify							
(Thailand) 2003	Didn't qualify							
(Algeria) 2005	Didn't qualify							
(Mexico) 2007	Didn't qualify							
(Italy) 2009	Didn't qualify							
(Argentina) 2011	Didn't qualify							
(Mexico) 2013		11th place						
(Argentina) 2015	Didn't qualify							
(Bahrain) 2017	Didn't qualify							
(Tunisia) 2019	Didn't qualify							
(Iran) 2021	Didn't qualify							
(Argentina) 2023	Didn't qualify							
(Uzbekistan) 2025		7th place						
Total	0 Titles	4/17						

=== Europe U19 / U18 Championship ===
Champions Runners up Third place Fourth place

Europe U19 / U18 Championship
Year	Round	Position	Pld	W	L	SW	SL	Squad
(Spain) 1995	Didn't qualify							
(Slovakia) 1997		8th place						
(Poland) 1999	Didn't qualify							
(Czech Republic) 2001	Didn't qualify							
(Croatia) 2003	Didn't qualify							
(Latvia) 2005	Didn't qualify							
(Austria) 2007	Didn't qualify							
(Netherlands) 2009	Didn't qualify							
(Turkey) 2011		12th place						
(Bosnia and Herzegovina) / (Serbia) 2013		4th place						
(Turkey) 2015	Didn't qualify							
(Hungary) / (Slovakia) 2017		8th place						
(Czech Republic) / (Slovakia) 2018	Didn't qualify							
(Italy) 2020	Withdrew							
(Georgia (country)) 2022		10th place						
(Bulgaria) 2024		5th place						
(Italy) 2026		10th place						
Total	0 Titles	7/17						

== Team ==
=== Current squad ===
The following players are the Finnish players that have competed in the 2018 Boys' U18 Volleyball European Championship

#	name	position	height	weight	birthday	spike	block
	Försti Joska	setter	184	70	2002	323	303
	Haltia Elias	opposite	189	80	2001	328	308
	Hänninen Tuomas	middle-blocker	192	90	2001	333	310
	Heinänen Henrik	outside-spiker	185	75	2001	325	306
	Help Vili-Valtteri	libero	185	85	2001	300	290
	Kattelus Ville	outside-spiker	183	70	2002	333	313
	Keskinen Roope	outside-spiker	196	80	2001	331	310
	Mäkelä Tommi	setter	192	80	2001	325	305
	Mäki Eetu	middle-blocker	193	79	2001	330	310
	Muukkonen Aleksi	opposite	195	90	2002	330	310
	Nikkinen Veeti	outside-spiker	200	85	2002	330	309
	Pöllänen Eemi	outside-spiker	187	75	2001	328	308
	Pozo-Hernandez Sebastian	outside-spiker	193	90	2002	330	311
	Puholainen Atte-Elias	opposite	193	85	2001	325	305
	Puronaho Pyry	libero	185	75	2001	315	295
	Saarimäki Peetu	libero	182	70	2001	310	290
	Simola Juuso	libero	170	65	2001	301	280
	Tihumäki Matias	outside-spiker	196	75	2001	330	310
	Vainionpää Ilmari	setter	190	80	2001	325	305
	Välimaa Santeri	setter	186	80	2001	310	290
	Viinikainen Matias	middle-blocker	193	80	2001	329	310
	Vuorinen Peter	outside-spiker	182	72	2001	315	295
	Ylönen Kimmo	middle-blocker	195	84	2001	330	310
