= 2024 Boys' U19 South American Volleyball Championship =

Tournament details
- Host country: Brazil
- City: Araguari
- Dates: 31 July – 4 August 2024
- Teams: 5
- Venue: 1 (in 1 host city)

Final positions
- Champions: Argentina (6th title)
- Runners-up: Brazil
- Third place: Colombia
- Fourth place: Chile

Tournament awards
- MVP: (Argentina) Federico Debonis
- Best Setter: (Argentina) Felipe Santarelli
- Best OH: (Argentina) Federico Debonis (Brazil) Diogo Pereira
- Best MB: (Chile) Gabriel Pavlovic (Brazil) Murilo Seidel
- Best OPP: (Brazil) Henrique Gouveia
- Best Libero: (Argentina) Ezequiel Parera

Tournament statistics
- Matches played: 10

The 2024 Boys' U19 South American Volleyball Championship was the 23rd edition of the Boys' Youth South American Volleyball Championship, a biennial international youth volleyball tournament organised by the Confederación Sudamericana de Voleibol (CSV) for the boys' under-19 national teams of South America. It was held for the second consecutive time in Araguari, Brazil from 31 July to 4 August 2024.

Same as previous editions, the tournament acted as the CSV qualifiers for the FIVB Volleyball Boys' U19 World Championship. The top three teams qualified for the 2025 FIVB Volleyball Boys' U19 World Championship as the CSV representatives.

Defending champions Argentina successfully retained their title after finishing first of the single group. Champions Argentina, runners-up Brazil and third-place Colombia qualified 2025 FIVB Volleyball Boys' U19 World Championship.

== Host and venue ==
Araguari	Location of the host city in the Federative Unit of Minas Gerais
Ginásio Poliesportivo General Mário Brum Negreiros	Location of the host city in the Federative Unit of Minas Gerais
Capacity: 2,200	Location of the host city in the Federative Unit of Minas Gerais

Araguari, Brazil was confirmed as host city of the tournament during the 76th CSV Annual Congress held on 13 July 2024 in Belo Horizonte, Brazil. This was the fourth time that Brazil hosted the tournament having previously done so in 1980, 2008 and the previous 2022 edition.

The competition was entirely played at the Ginásio Poliesportivo General Mário Brum Negreiros.

== Teams ==
Five of the twelve CSV member associations entered the tournament.

Team	App	Previous best performance
Argentina (holders)	22nd	Champions (2008, 2010, 2014, 2016, 2022)
Brazil (hosts)	23rd	Champions (17 times, most recent 2018)
Chile	21st	Third place (5 times, most recent 2014)
Colombia	16th	Third place (8 times, most recent 2018)
Peru	15th	Fourth place (1988, 1994)

=== Squads ===
Each national team had to register a squad of 12 players. Players born on or after 1 January 2007 were eligible to compete in the tournament.

== Competition format ==
The competition format depends on the number of participating teams. With 5 teams, a single group of five were formed which was played on a single round-robin basis. No finals or placement matches are played. The group standing procedure was as follows:

1. Number of matches won;
2. Match points;
  - Match won 3–0: 3 match points for the winner, 0 match points for the loser
  - Match won 3–1: 3 match points for the winner, 0 match point for the loser
  - Match won 3–2: 2 match points for the winner, 1 match points for the loser
3. Sets ratio;
4. Points ratio;
5. If the tie continues between two teams: result of the last match between the tied teams;
6. If the tie continues between three or more teams: a new classification would be made taking into consideration only the matches between involved teams.

== Standings ==
Pos	Team	Pld	W	L	Pts	SW	SL	SR	SPW	SPL	SPR	Qualification
1	Argentina (C)	4	4	0	11	12	2	6.000	326	276	1.181	2025 FIVB Volleyball Boys' U19 World Championship
2	Brazil (H)	4	3	1	10	11	4	2.750	359	254	1.413	2025 FIVB Volleyball Boys' U19 World Championship
3	Colombia	4	2	2	5	6	8	0.750	287	299	0.960	2025 FIVB Volleyball Boys' U19 World Championship
4	Chile	4	1	3	3	6	11	0.545	331	367	0.902	
5	Peru	4	0	4	1	2	12	0.167	225	332	0.678	

Rules for classification: Tiebreakers
(C) Champion; (H) Host

== Results ==
All match times are local times, BRT (UTC-3).

Date	Time		Score		Set 1	Set 2	Set 3	Set 4	Set 5	Total	Report
31 Jul	17:30	Argentina	3–0	Chile	25–16	25–22	25–22			75–60	P2 Report
31 Jul	20:00	Brazil	3–0	Peru	25–10	25–10	25–12			75–32	P2 Report
1 Aug	17:30	Argentina	3–0	Peru	25–18	25–20	25–11			75–49	P2 Report
1 Aug	20:00	Brazil	3–0	Colombia	25–19	25–17	25–16			75–52	P2 Report
2 Aug	17:30	Chile	3–2	Peru	21–25	25–13	20–25	25–13	16–14	107–90	P2 Report
2 Aug	20:30	Argentina	3–0	Colombia	25–20	25–20	25–18			75–58	P2 Report
3 Aug	15:00	Peru	0–3	Colombia	18–25	19–25	17–25			54–75	P2 Report
3 Aug	17:00	Brazil	3–1	Chile	25–27	25–12	25–15	25–15		100–69	P2 Report
4 Aug	15:00	Chile	2–3	Colombia	25–23	25–13	24–26	13–25	8–15	95–102	P2 Report
4 Aug	17:00	Brazil	2–3	Argentina	24–26	25–16	22–25	25–19	13–15	109–101	P2 Report

== Final standing ==
Qualified for 2025 FIVB Boys' U19 World Championship.

Rank	Team
1st place, gold medalist(s)	Argentina
2nd place, silver medalist(s)	Brazil
3rd place, bronze medalist(s)	Colombia
4	Chile
5	Peru

2024 Boys' U19 South American Championship champions

Argentina
Sixth title

Team Roster:

Felipe Santarelli, Nehuén D'Aversa, Iván Pavón, Mauro Gay, Santiago Martín, Federico Debonis, Gonzalo Pedernera, Samuel Guidi (c), Tomás Omarini, Juan Cruz Iraldi, Ezequiel Parera (L), Joaquín Gallardo

Head coach: (Argentina) Rodrigo Martínez Granados

== Individual awards ==
The following individual awards were presented at the end of the tournament.

- Most valuable player (MVP)

Frederico Debonis (ARG)

- Best middle blockers

Gabriel Pavlovic (CHI)
Murilo Seidel (BRA)

- Best setter

Felipe Santarelli (ARG)

- Best opposite spiker

Henrique Gouveia (BRA)

- Best outside spikers

Federico Debonis (ARG)
Diogo Pereira (BRA)

- Best libero

Ezequiel Parera (ARG)

== See also ==
- 2024 Girls' U19 South American Volleyball Championship
