= Gonzalo Quiroga =

Argentine volleyball player (born 1993)

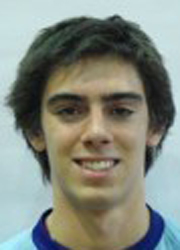

Personal information
- Born: 25 February 1993 (age 33); San Juan, Argentina
- Height: 1.92 m (6 ft 4 in)

Volleyball information
- Position: Outside hitter
- Current club: GKS Katowice
- Number: 9

Career
Years	Teams
2011–2014; 2014–2016; 2016–2017; 2017–2019; 2019–2020; 2020–2021; 2021–2023; 2023–2024; 2024–2025; 2025–	UCLA Bruins; Tonazzo Padova; Obras Sanitarias; GKS Katowice; BKS Visła Bydgoszcz; Cambrai Volley; GKS Katowice; Tourcoing LM; Tours VB; GKS Katowice

National team
Argentina
Honours
Men's volleyball
Representing Argentina
Pan American Games
Bronze medal – third place	2011 Guadalajara
Pan American Cup
Silver medal – second place	2012 Santo Domingo
Bronze medal – third place	2014 Tijuana
CSV South American Championship
Bronze medal – third place	2017 Santiago/Temuco
Summer Youth Olympics
Silver medal – second place	2010 Singapore

Gonzalo Quiroga (born 25 February 1993) is an Argentine professional volleyball player who plays as an outside hitter for GKS Katowice.

He has an older brother, Rodrigo who is also a volleyball player. They are both nephews of Raúl Quiroga, a bronze medallist at the Olympic Games Seoul 1988.

== Sporting achievements ==
=== Youth national team ===
- 2010 CSV U19 South American Championship
- 2012 U23 Pan American Cup
- 2014 CSV U23 South American Championship

=== Individual awards ===
- 2010: CSV U19 South American Championship – Most valuable player
- 2010: CSV U19 South American Championship – Best receiver
- 2014: CSV U23 South American Championship – Best outside hitter
