= Guilherme Rech =

Brazilian volleyball player (born 2001)

Personal information
- Nationality: (Brazil) Brazilian
- Born: 5 January 2001 (age 25); Jaraguá, Goiás
- Height: 6 ft 8 in (2.04 m)
- Weight: 203 lb (92 kg)

Volleyball information
- Position: Middle blocker
- Current club: (Brazil) Sada Cruzeiro Vôlei
- Number: 6

Career
Years	Teams
2018–2019; 2020–2021; 2021–	(Brazil) Lavras Vôlei (Brazil) Pacaembu Ribeirão Preto (Brazil) Sada Cruzeiro Vôlei

Guilherme Rech (born 5 January 2001) is a Brazilian volleyball player who plays as a middle blocker.

== Sporting achievements ==
=== Clubs ===
Brazilian Super Cup:

- 2021, 2022

FIVB Men's Club World Championship:

- 2021
- 2022

Men's South American Club Championship:

- 2022, 2023

Brazilian Championship:

- 2022, 2023

Brazilian Cup:

- 2023

=== National team ===
Boys' Youth South American Championship:

- 2018
