= Mihajlo Stanković =

Serbian volleyball player (born 1993)

Personal information
- Full name: Mihajlo Stanković
- Nationality: Serbian
- Born: 5 June 1993 (age 33); Novi Sad, Serbia
- Height: 2.00 m (6 ft 7 in)
- Weight: 83 kg (183 lb)
- Spike: 335 cm (132 in)
- Block: 324 cm (128 in)

Volleyball information
- Position: Outside hitter
- Current club: Maliye Milli Piyango SK

Career
Years	Teams
2009–2015; 2015–2017; 2017–	OK Vojvodina Novi Sad; PGE Skra Bełchatów; Maliye Milli Piyango SK

National team
Serbia
Honours
Men's volleyball
Representing Serbia
U23 World Championship
Silver medal – second place	2013 Brazil
U19 World Championship
Gold medal – first place	2011 Argentina
- Last updated: 3 September 2017

Mihajlo Stanković (born 5 June 1993) is a Serbian volleyball player, a member of Serbia men's national volleyball team and Turkish club Develi Belediyespor U19 European Champion 2011, U19 World Champion 2011.

== Career ==
=== Club ===
In 2015 went to Polish club - PGE Skra Bełchatów. On 7 February 2016 he played with PGE Skra and won the 2016 Polish Cup after beating ZAKSA in the final. In April 2016 he was a member of the same team which won a bronze medal in the 2015–16 PlusLiga championship.

== Sporting achievements ==
=== Clubs ===
==== CEV Challenge Cup ====
- 2014/2015 - with OK Vojvodina Novi Sad

==== National championships ====
- 2009/2010 Serbian Cup, with OK Vojvodina Novi Sad
- 2010/2011 Serbian Championship, with OK Vojvodina Novi Sad
- 2011/2012 Serbian Cup, with OK Vojvodina Novi Sad
- 2011/2012 Serbian Championship, with OK Vojvodina Novi Sad
- 2013/2014 Serbian Championship, with OK Vojvodina Novi Sad
- 2014/2015 Serbian Cup, with OK Vojvodina Novi Sad
- 2015/2016 Polish Cup, with PGE Skra Bełchatów
- 2015/2016 Polish Championship, with PGE Skra Bełchatów
- 2016/2017 Polish Championship, with PGE Skra Bełchatów

=== National team ===
- 2011 CEV U19 European Championship
- 2011 FIVB U19 World Championship
