= Pakistan Volleyball Federation =

Pakistani sports governing body

- Sport: Volleyball
- Jurisdiction: Pakistan
- Abbreviation: PVF
- Founded: 1955; 71 years ago
- Affiliation: FIVB
- Regional affiliation: AVC
- Headquarters: Lahore, Punjab, Pakistan
- President: Chaudhry Muhammad Yaqoob
- Secretary: Engr.Shah Naeem Zafar

Official website
- pakistanvolleyball.pk
- (Pakistan)

Pakistan Volleyball Federation (PVF) is the national governing body responsible for developing and promoting volleyball in the country. Established in 1955, the PVF has since organised volleyball activities at the national level. It is affiliated with both the International Volleyball Federation (FIVB) and the Asian Volleyball Confederation (AVC).

== Achievements ==
- In 1958, the Pakistan national volleyball team visited Iran to play against the national team of Iran. Pakistan won all the matches against Iran.
- In 1989, the Pakistan volleyball team placed 4th in the Asian Volleyball Championship held in Seoul and defeated the national team of India at the 4th South Asian Federation Games held in Islamabad.
- In 1994, Pakistan Junior team managed to win the seven matches series against China.
- In 2007, Pakistan Volleyball Team won one silver and one Bronze medal in 2nd Asian Central Zone Volleyball Championship held in Colombo, Sri Lanka and the 2nd Commonwealth Volleyball Championship held in India respectively.
- In 2008, Pakistan Junior Volleyball Team won one Bronze medal in the 14th Asian Junior Men’s Volleyball Championship held in Tehran, Iran.
- In 2022, Pakistan Volleyball Team beat Iran and won Central Asian Zone Volleyball Championship held in Lahore, Pakistan.
- Presently, the Pakistan Volleyball team standing positions are; 41 out of 220 in the World and 7 out of 64 in the Asia.

== National teams ==
For details please refer to main articles for dedicated teams.

Men

- Pakistan men's national volleyball team
- Under-21
- Under-19
- Under-17

Women

- Pakistan women's national volleyball team
- Under-21
- Under-19
- Under-17

== Affiliations ==
- International Federation of Volleyball
- Asian Volleyball Confederation
- Pakistan Sports Board
- Pakistan Olympic Association

== See also ==
- Pakistan volleyball federation organizational structure
