= 2012 Boys' Youth South American Volleyball Championship =

Tournament details
- Host country: Chile
- Dates: 7 – 11 November
- Teams: 9
- Venue: 1 (in Santiago host cities)

Final positions
- Champions: Brazil (16th title)

Tournament awards
- MVP: Dusan Bonacic (CHI)

The 2012 Boys' Youth South American Volleyball Championship was the 18th edition of the tournament, organised by South America's governing volleyball body, the Confederación Sudamericana de Voleibol (CSV). It was held in Santiago, Chile. The top three teams qualified for the 2013 Youth World Championship.

== Competing nations ==
For the first time, Bolivia send a youth team to a South American Championship, making it the first time in South America 9 teams participated. The following national teams participated, teams were seeded according to how they finished in the previous edition of the tournament; teams that did not participate in the previous championship were seeded according to ranking:

Pool A	Pool B	Pool C
Chile (Host & 5th); Peru (6th); Uruguay	Argentina (1st); Colombia (4th); Paraguay	Brazil (2nd); Venezuela (3rd); Bolivia

== First round ==
The top team from each pool plus the best second place team will qualify to the semifinals.

=== Pool A ===
Pos	Team	Pld	W	L	Pts	SPW	SPL	SPR	SW	SL	SR	Qualification
1	Chile	2	2	0	6	172	103	1.670	6	1	6.000	Semifinals
2	Peru	2	1	1	3	144	146	0.986	4	3	1.333	5–8 classification matches
3	Uruguay	2	0	2	0	85	150	0.567	0	6	0.000	5–8 classification matches

Date	Time		Score		Set 1	Set 2	Set 3	Set 4	Set 5	Total
7 Nov	19:00	Peru	3–0	Uruguay	25–14	25–19	25–16			75–49
8 Nov	19:00	Chile	3–0	Uruguay	25–10	25–13	25–11			75–34
9 Nov	19:00	Chile	3–1	Peru	22–25	25–12	25–15	25–17		97–69

=== Pool B ===
Pos	Team	Pld	W	L	Pts	SPW	SPL	SPR	SW	SL	SR	Qualification
1	Argentina	2	2	0	6	150	78	1.923	6	0	MAX	Semifinals
2	Colombia	2	1	1	3	124	106	1.170	3	3	1.000	5–8 classification matches
3	Paraguay	2	0	2	0	60	150	0.400	0	6	0.000	5–8 classification matches

Date	Time		Score		Set 1	Set 2	Set 3	Set 4	Set 5	Total
7 Nov	14:30	Colombia	3–0	Paraguay	25–17	25–5	25–9			75–31
8 Nov	14:30	Argentina	3–0	Paraguay	25–10	25–14	25–5			75–29
9 Nov	17:00	Argentina	3–0	Colombia	25–21	25–16	25–12			75–49

=== Pool C ===
Pos	Team	Pld	W	L	Pts	SPW	SPL	SPR	SW	SL	SR	Qualification
1	Brazil	2	2	0	6	180	131	1.374	6	1	6.000	Semifinals
2	Venezuela	2	1	1	3	177	125	1.416	4	3	1.333	Semifinals
3	Bolivia	2	0	2	0	49	150	0.327	0	6	0.000	Eliminated

Date	Time		Score		Set 1	Set 2	Set 3	Set 4	Set 5	Total
7 Nov	17:00	Venezuela	3–0	Bolivia	25–5	25–6	25–9			75–20
8 Nov	17:00	Brazil	3–0	Bolivia	25–8	25–10	25–11			75–29
9 Nov	14:30	Brazil	3–1	Venezuela	22–25	25–23	31–29	27–25		105–102

=== Overall Ranking ===
Pos	Team	Pld	W	L	Pts	SPW	SPL	SPR	SW	SL	SR	Qualification
1	Argentina	2	2	0	6	150	78	1.923	6	0	MAX	Semifinals
2	Chile	2	2	0	6	172	103	1.670	6	1	6.000	Semifinals
3	Brazil	2	2	0	6	180	131	1.374	6	1	6.000	Semifinals
4	Venezuela	2	1	1	3	177	125	1.416	4	3	1.333	Semifinals
5	Peru	2	1	1	3	144	146	0.986	4	3	1.333	5–8 classification matches
6	Colombia	2	1	1	3	124	106	1.170	3	3	1.000	5–8 classification matches
7	Uruguay	2	0	2	0	85	150	0.567	0	6	0.000	5–8 classification matches
8	Paraguay	2	0	2	0	60	150	0.400	0	6	0.000	5–8 classification matches
9	Bolivia	2	0	2	0	49	150	0.327	0	6	0.000	Eliminated

== Final round ==
=== 5/8 Classification bracket ===
5/8 Classification
2012-11-10 – Santiago
Peru	3
Paraguay	0
2012-11-10 – Santiago
Colombia	3
Uruguay	0

5th place match
2012-11-11 – Santiago
Peru	0
Colombia	3
7th place match
2012-11-11 – Santiago
Paraguay	0
Uruguay	3

=== Championship bracket ===
Semifinals
2012-11-10 – Santiago
Brazil	3
Venezuela	0
2012-11-10 – Santiago
Chile	0
Argentina	3

Final
2012-11-11 – Santiago
Brazil	3
Argentina	1
Third place
2012-11-11 – Santiago
Venezuela	0
Chile	3

=== Classification 5/8 ===
Date	Time		Score		Set 1	Set 2	Set 3	Set 4	Set 5	Total
10 Nov	10:00	Colombia	3–0	Uruguay	25–16	25–13	25–15			75–44
10 Nov	12:00	Peru	3–0	Paraguay	25–13	25–11	25–19			75–43

=== Semifinals ===
Date	Time		Score		Set 1	Set 2	Set 3	Set 4	Set 5	Total
10 Nov	15:00	Brazil	3–0	Venezuela	25–12	25–18	25–15			75–45
10 Nov	17:00	Chile	0–3	Argentina	22–25	21–25	20–25			63–75

=== 7th place match ===
Date	Time		Score		Set 1	Set 2	Set 3	Set 4	Set 5	Total
11 Nov	10:00	Paraguay	0–3	Uruguay	24–26	17–25	21–25			62–76

=== 5th place match ===
Date	Time		Score		Set 1	Set 2	Set 3	Set 4	Set 5	Total
11 Nov	12:00	Peru	0–3	Colombia	25–27	12–25	23–25			60–77

=== 3rd place match ===
Date	Time		Score		Set 1	Set 2	Set 3	Set 4	Set 5	Total
11 Nov	15:00	Chile	3–0	Venezuela	25–20	25–11	25–18			75–49

=== Final ===
Date	Time		Score		Set 1	Set 2	Set 3	Set 4	Set 5	Total
11 Nov	17:00	Brazil	3–1	Argentina	25–13	18–25	25–23	25–22		93–83

== Final standing ==
Rank	Team
1st place, gold medalist(s)	Brazil
2nd place, silver medalist(s)	Argentina
3rd place, bronze medalist(s)	Chile
4	Venezuela
5	Colombia
6	Peru
7	Uruguay
8	Paraguay
9	Bolivia

Qualified for the 2013 Youth World Championship

2012 Boys' Youth South American champions

Brazil
16th title

== Individual awards ==
- Most valuable player
  - Dusan Bonacic (CHI)
- Best spiker
  - Douglas Bastos (BRA)
- Best blocker
  - Douglas Bastos (BRA)
- Best server
  - Douglas Souza (BRA)
- Best digger
  - Michael Varasio (ARG)
- Best setter
  - Fernando Kreling (BRA)
- Best receiver
  - Óscar García (VEN)
- Best libero
  - Eduardo Rodríguez (PER)
