= 2014 Boys' Youth South American Volleyball Championship =

2014 youth volleyball championship

Tournament details
- Host country: Colombia
- Dates: 10 – 13 September
- Teams: 4
- Venue: 1 (in Paipa host cities)

Final positions
- Champions: Argentina (3rd title)

Tournament awards
- MVP: Felipe Benavidez (ARG)

The 2014 Boys' Youth South American Volleyball Championship was the 19th edition of the competition, organised by South America's governing volleyball body, the Confederación Sudamericana de Voleibol (CSV). It was held in Paipa, Colombia. The top two teams qualified for the 2015 FIVB Boys Youth World Championship.

== First round ==
Pos	Team	Pld	W	L	Pts	SW	SL	SR	SPW	SPL	SPR	Qualification
1	Brazil	3	3	0	8	9	2	4.500	275	234	1.175	Final
2	Argentina	3	2	1	7	8	3	2.667	266	223	1.193	Final
3	Colombia	3	1	2	3	3	7	0.429	228	244	0.934	3rd place match
4	Chile	3	0	3	0	1	9	0.111	180	248	0.726	3rd place match

Date	Time		Score		Set 1	Set 2	Set 3	Set 4	Set 5	Total	Report
10 Sep	17:00	Brazil	3–2	Argentina	25–27	24–26	25–19	29–27	15–13	118–112	
10 Sep	19:00	Colombia	3–1	Chile	25–22	25–22	23–25	25–14		98–83	
11 Sep	17:00	Chile	0–3	Brazil	19–25	14–25	19–25			52–75	
11 Sep	19:00	Argentina	3–0	Colombia	25–19	29–27	25–14			79–60	
12 Sep	17:00	Argentina	3–0	Chile	25–18	25–15	25–12			75–45	
12 Sep	19:00	Colombia	0–3	Brazil	26–28	27–29	17–25			70–82	

== Final round ==
=== Classification 3-4 ===
Date	Time		Score		Set 1	Set 2	Set 3	Set 4	Set 5	Total	Report
13-Sep	17:00	Colombia	1–3	Chile	27–29	22–25	25–17	23–25		97–96	

=== Final ===
Date	Time		Score		Set 1	Set 2	Set 3	Set 4	Set 5	Total	Report
13-Sep	19:00	Brazil	0–3	Argentina	21–25	23–25	23–25			67–75	

== Final standing ==
Rank	Team
1st place, gold medalist(s)	Argentina
2nd place, silver medalist(s)	Brazil
3rd place, bronze medalist(s)	Chile
4	Colombia

Qualified for the 2015 Youth World Championship

2014 Boys' Youth South American champions

Argentina
3rd title

== All-Star Team ==
- Most valuable player
  - Felipe Benavidez (ARG)
- Best setter
  - Esteban Villareal (CHI)
- Best Opposite
  - Pablo Moreno (COL)
- Best Outside Hitters
  - Felipe Benavidez (ARG)
  - Kaio Ribeiro (BRA)
- Best Middle Blockers
  - Sergio Soria (ARG)
  - Erick Costa (BRA)
- Best libero
  - Rodrigo Michelon (ARG)
