= 2010 Boys' Youth South American Volleyball Championship =

Tournament details
- Host country: Venezuela
- Dates: April 12–16
- Teams: 6
- Venue: 1 (in 1 host city)

Final positions
- Champions: Argentina (2nd title)

Tournament awards
- MVP: (Argentina) Gonzalo Quiroga

The 2010 Boys' Youth South American Volleyball Championship was the 17th edition of the tournament, organised by South America's governing volleyball body, the Confederación Sudamericana de Voleibol (CSV) for Under-19 teams. It was held in Venezuela. The top national team other than Argentina qualified to the 2011 Youth World Championship, Argentina had already secured a berth as Host.

== Teams ==
- Argentina
- Brazil
- Chile
- Colombia
- Peru
- Venezuela

== Competition System ==
The competition system for the 2010 Boys' Youth South American Championship was a single Round-Robin system. Each team plays once against each of the 5 remaining teams. Points are accumulated during the whole tournament, and the final ranking is determined by the total points gained.

== Results ==
- All times are VET (UTC−04:30).

Pos	Team	Pld	W	L	Pts	SW	SL	SR	SPW	SPL	SPR
1	Argentina	5	5	0	10	15	0	MAX	378	266	1.421
2	Brazil	5	4	1	9	12	3	4.000	373	262	1.424
3	Venezuela	5	2	3	7	6	10	0.600	343	337	1.018
4	Colombia	5	2	3	7	7	9	0.778	317	358	0.885
5	Chile	5	1	4	6	3	12	0.250	268	338	0.793
6	Peru	5	1	4	6	3	12	0.250	245	347	0.706

=== Matches ===
Date	Time		Score		Set 1	Set 2	Set 3	Set 4	Set 5	Total
12 Apr	13:00	Argentina	3–0	Colombia	25–19	25–19	25–20			75–58
12 Apr	15:00	Brazil	3–0	Chile	25–11	25–13	25–18			75–42
12 Apr	17:00	Peru	3–0	Venezuela	25–13	25–19	25–15			75–47
13 Apr	13:00	Brazil	3–0	Colombia	25–15	25–13	25–16			75–44
13 Apr	15:00	Argentina	3–0	Peru	25–5	25–7	25–13			75–25
13 Apr	17:00	Venezuela	3–0	Chile	25–20	25–17	25–10			75–47
14 Apr	13:00	Colombia	3–0	Peru	25–20	25–21	25–12			75–53
14 Apr	15:00	Argentina	3–0	Chile	25–16	25–15	25–16			75–47
14 Apr	17:00	Brazil	3–0	Venezuela	25–18	25–21	25–21			75–60
15 Apr	13:00	Chile	3–0	Peru	25–16	25–21	25–17			75–54
15 Apr	15:00	Argentina	3–0	Brazil	28–26	25–22	27–25			78–73
15 Apr	17:00	Venezuela	3–1	Colombia	25–12	25–16	23–25	25–12		98–65
16 Apr	13:00	Brazil	3–0	Peru	25–9	25–13	25–16			75–38
16 Apr	15:00	Colombia	3–0	Chile	25–18	26–24	25–15			75–57
16 Apr	17:00	Argentina	3–0	Venezuela	25–21	25–23	25–20			75–63

== Final standing ==
Rank	Team
1st place, gold medalist(s)	Argentina
2nd place, silver medalist(s)	Brazil
3rd place, bronze medalist(s)	Venezuela
4	Colombia
5	Chile
6	Peru

Qualified for the 2011 Boys Youth World Championship

2010 Boys' Youth South American champions

Argentina
2nd title

== Individual awards ==
- Most valuable player
  - Gonzalo Quiroga (ARG)
- Best spiker
  - Daniel Arteaga (VEN)
- Best blocker
  - Flávio Gualberto (BRA)
- Best server
  - Emerson Rodríguez (VEN)
- Best setter
  - Fernando Arpajou (ARG)
- Best digger
  - Leonardo Tomazi (BRA)
- Best receiver
  - Gonzalo Quiroga (ARG)
- Best libero
  - Martín Weber (ARG)
