= Boys' Youth South American Volleyball Championship =

International volleyball competition

- Current season, competition or edition: 2026 Boys' U19 South American Volleyball Championship
- Sport: Volleyball
- Founded: 1978
- Continent: South America (CSV)
- Most recent champion: Brazil (18th title)
- Most titles: Brazil (18 titles)

The Boys' Youth South American Volleyball Championship is a sport competition for national volleyball teams with players under 19 years of age, currently held biannually and organized by the Confederación Sudamericana de Voleibol (CSV), the South American volleyball federation.

== Results summary ==
Year	Host	Final			3rd place match			Teams
Year	Host	Champions	Score	Runners-up	3rd place	Score	4th place	Teams
1978; Details	(Argentina); Buenos Aires	Brazil	Round-robin	Argentina	Venezuela	Round-robin	Paraguay	6
1980; Details	(Brazil); São Paulo	Brazil	Round-robin	Argentina	Venezuela	Round-robin	Chile	6
1982; Details	(Paraguay); Asunción	Brazil	Round-robin	Argentina	Paraguay	Round-robin	Chile	4
1984; Details	(Chile); Santiago	Brazil	Round-robin	Argentina	Chile			3
1986; Details	(Peru); Lima	Brazil	Round-robin	Argentina	Chile	Round-robin	Colombia	5
1988; Details	(Argentina); Córdoba	Brazil	Round-robin	Argentina	Chile	Round-robin	Peru	6
1990; Details	(Bolivia); La Paz	Brazil	Round-robin	Argentina	Venezuela	Round-robin	Paraguay	7
1992; Details	(Venezuela); Valencia	Brazil	Round-robin	Argentina	Colombia	Round-robin	Venezuela	4
1994; Details	(Venezuela); Caracas	Brazil	Round-robin	Venezuela	Colombia	Round-robin	Peru	4
1996; Details	(Paraguay); Asunción	Brazil	Round-robin	Venezuela	Colombia	Round-robin	Argentina	7
1998; Details	(Ecuador); Quito	Brazil	Round-robin	Venezuela	Colombia	Round-robin	Argentina	7
2000; Details	(Argentina); Neuquén	Brazil	Round-robin	Venezuela	Argentina	Round-robin	Colombia	8
2002; Details	(Chile); Santiago	Brazil	Round-robin	Argentina	Venezuela	Round-robin	Chile	5
2004; Details	(Colombia); Cali	Brazil	Round-robin	Argentina	Colombia	Round-robin	Chile	6
2006; Details	(Argentina); Rosario	Brazil	3–0	Argentina	Venezuela	3–0	Chile	8
2008; Details	(Brazil); Poços de Caldas	Argentina	3–1	Brazil	Venezuela	3–0	Chile	8
2010; Details	(Venezuela); La Guaira	Argentina	Round-robin	Brazil	Venezuela	Round-robin	Colombia	6
2012; Details	(Chile); Santiago	Brazil	3–1	Argentina	Chile	3–0	Venezuela	9
2014; Details	(Colombia); Paipa	Argentina	3–0	Brazil	Chile	3–1	Colombia	4
2016; Details	(Peru); Lima	Argentina	3–0	Brazil	Colombia	3–1	Bolivia	6
2018; Details	(Colombia); Sopó	Brazil	3–0	Argentina	Colombia	3–0	Bolivia	8
2022; Details	(Brazil); Araguari	Argentina	3–0	Brazil	Colombia	3–0	Chile	6
2024; Details	(Brazil); Araguari	Argentina	Round-robin	Brazil	Colombia	Round-robin	Chile	5
2026; Details	(Brazil); Araguari	Brazil	3–0	Argentina	Venezuela	3–0	Chile	8

== Medal table ==
Rank	Nation	Gold	Silver	Bronze	Total
1	Brazil	18	6	0	24
2	Argentina	6	14	1	21
3	Venezuela	0	4	8	12
4	Colombia	0	0	9	9
5	Chile	0	0	5	5
6	Paraguay	0	0	1	1
Totals (6 entries)		24	24	24	72

== See also ==
- Girls' Youth South American Volleyball Championship
- Men's Junior South American Volleyball Championship
- Men's U23 South American Volleyball Championship
- Boys' U17 South American Volleyball Championship
