= 2022 Boys' U19 South American Volleyball Championship =

Tournament details
- Host country: Brazil
- City: Araguari
- Dates: 24–28 August 2022
- Teams: 6
- Venue: 1 (in 1 host city)

Final positions
- Champions: Argentina (5th title)
- Runners-up: Brazil
- Third place: Colombia
- Fourth place: Chile

Tournament awards
- MVP: (Brazil) Bryan Silva
- Best Setter: (Argentina) Lucas Astegiano
- Best OH: (Brazil) João Pedro (Argentina) Fausto Diaz
- Best MB: (Brazil) Samuel Santos (Argentina) Emiliano Molini
- Best OPP: (Chile) Ian Gei
- Best Libero: (Brazil) João Gameiro

Tournament statistics
- Matches played: 11

The 2022 Boys' U19 South American Volleyball Championship was the 22nd edition of the Boys' U19 South American Volleyball Championship, a biennial international boys' volleyball tournament organised by the Confederación Sudamericana de Voleibol (CSV) for the boys' under-19 national teams of South America. It was held in Araguari, Brazil from 24 to 28 August 2022.

Same as previous editions, the tournament acted as the CSV qualifiers for the FIVB Volleyball Boys' U19 World Championship. The top three teams qualified for the 2023 FIVB Volleyball Boys' U19 World Championship as the CSV representatives, besides Argentina who automatically qualify as host.

Argentina won their fifth title after beating Brazil 3–0 in the final. Colombia defeated Chile also by a 3–0 score in the third place match to take the bronce medal. These four teams qualified for the 2023 U19 World Championship, including fourth-place Chile, who qualified after Argentina was named hosts of that U19 World Championship, in January 2023.

== Host and venue ==
Araguari	Location of the host citie in the Federative Unit of Minas Gerais
Ginásio Poliesportivo General Mário Brum Negreiros	Location of the host citie in the Federative Unit of Minas Gerais
Capacity: 2,200	Location of the host citie in the Federative Unit of Minas Gerais

Araguari, Brazil was confirmed as host city of the tournament during the 75th CSV Annual Congress held on 13 April 2022 in Belo Horizonte, Brazil.

The competition was entirely played at the Ginásio Poliesportivo General Mário Brum Negreiros.

== Teams ==
Six of the twelve CSV member associations entered the tournament.

Team	App	Previous best performance
Argentina	21st	Champions (2008, 2010, 2014, 2016)
Brazil (hosts and holders)	22nd	Champions (17 times, most recent 2018)
Chile	20th	Third place (5 times, most recent 2014)
Colombia	15th	Third place (8 times, most recent 2018)
Peru	14th	Fourth place (1988, 1994)
Uruguay	8th	Fifth place (1988, 2006)

=== Squads ===
Each national team had to register a squad of 14 players. Players born on or after 1 January 2005 were eligible to compete in the tournament.

== Competition format ==
The competition format depends on the number of participating teams. With 6 teams, two pools of three teams each were formed. The group standing procedure was as follows:

1. Number of matches won;
2. Match points;
  - Match won 3–0: 3 match points for the winner, 0 match points for the loser
  - Match won 3–1: 3 match points for the winner, 0 match point for the loser
  - Match won 3–2: 2 match points for the winner, 1 match points for the loser
3. Sets ratio;
4. Points ratio;
5. If the tie continues between two teams: result of the last match between the tied teams;
6. If the tie continues between three or more teams: a new classification would be made taking into consideration only the matches between involved teams.

The top two teams of each pool advanced to the semi-finals, with the winners playing the final and the losers playing the third place match. The third-placed teams of each group played the fifth place match.

== Classification phase ==
All match times are local times, BRT (UTC-3).

=== Pool A ===
Pos	Team	Pld	W	L	Pts	SW	SL	SR	SPW	SPL	SPR	Qualification
1	Brazil (H)	2	2	0	6	6	0	MAX	154	104	1.481	Semi-finals
2	Chile	2	1	1	2	3	5	0.600	163	175	0.931	Semi-finals
3	Peru	2	0	2	1	2	6	0.333	140	178	0.787	Fifth-place match

Rules for classification: Tiebreakers
(H) Host

Date	Time		Score		Set 1	Set 2	Set 3	Set 4	Set 5	Total	Report
24 Aug	20:00	Brazil	3–0	Peru	25–11	25–19	25–14			75–44	[ Report]
25 Aug	20:00	Brazil	3–0	Chile	25–20	29–27	22–13			76–60	[ Report]
26 Aug	20:00	Chile	3–2	Peru	25–20	25–14	17–25	21–25	15–12	103–96	[ Report]

=== Pool B ===
Pos	Team	Pld	W	L	Pts	SW	SL	SR	SPW	SPL	SPR	Qualification
1	Argentina	2	2	0	5	6	2	3.000	174	124	1.403	Semi-finals
2	Colombia	2	1	1	4	5	3	1.667	169	134	1.261	Semi-finals
3	Uruguay	3	0	3	0	0	6	0.000	55	150	0.367	Fifth-place match

Rules for classification: Tiebreakers

Date	Time		Score		Set 1	Set 2	Set 3	Set 4	Set 5	Total	Report
24 Aug	18:00	Argentina	3–0	Uruguay	25–10	25–8	25–12			75–30	[ Report]
25 Aug	18:00	Colombia	3–0	Uruguay	25–12	25–13	22–10			72–35	[ Report]
26 Aug	18:00	Argentina	3–2	Colombia	17–25	17–25	25–18	25–16	15–10	99–94	[ Report]

== Final phase ==
=== Bracket ===
Semi-finals
27 August
Brazil	3
Colombia	1
27 August
Argentina	3
Chile	0

Final
28 August
Brazil	0
Argentina	3

Fifth-place match
27 August
Peru	0
Uruguay	3

Third-place match
28 August
Colombia	3
Chile	0

=== Semi-finals ===
Date	Time		Score		Set 1	Set 2	Set 3	Set 4	Set 5	Total	Report
27 Aug	16:00	Argentina	3–0	Chile	25–12	25–16	25–20			75–48	[ Report]
27 Aug	18:00	Brazil	3–1	Colombia	25–15	25–18	23–25	25–14		98–72	[ Report]

=== Fifth-place match ===
Date	Time		Score		Set 1	Set 2	Set 3	Set 4	Set 5	Total	Report
27 Aug	14:00	Peru	0–3	Uruguay	21–25	23–25	19–25			63–75	[ Report]

=== Third-place match ===
Date	Time		Score		Set 1	Set 2	Set 3	Set 4	Set 5	Total	Report
28 Aug	13:00	Colombia	3–0	Chile	25–14	25–17	25–14			75–45	[ Report]

=== Final ===
Date	Time		Score		Set 1	Set 2	Set 3	Set 4	Set 5	Total	Report
28 Aug	15:00	Brazil	0–3	Argentina	19–25	26–28	20–25			65–78	[ Report]

== Final standing ==
Qualified for 2023 FIVB Boys' U19 World Championship.

Rank	Team
1st place, gold medalist(s)	Argentina
2nd place, silver medalist(s)	Brazil
3rd place, bronze medalist(s)	Colombia
4	Chile
5	Uruguay
6	Peru

2024 Boys' U19 South American Championship champions

Argentina
Fifth title

Team Roster:

Thiago Bucci, Iñaki Ramos (c), Juan Sánchez, Mateo Gómez, Lorenzo Giraudo, Lucas Astegiano, Fausto López, Fausto Díaz, Luca Duek (L), Emiliano Molini, Agustín Moyano, Bautista Danna, Leonardo Herbsommer, Braulio Mendoza (L).

Head coach: (Argentina) Marcos Blanco

== Individual awards ==
The following individual awards were presented at the end of the tournament.

- Most valuable player (MVP)

Bryan Silva (BRA)

- Best middle blockers

Samuel Santos (BRA)
Emiliano Molini (ARG)

- Best setter

Lucas Astegiano (ARG)

- Best opposite spiker

Ian Gei (CHI)

- Best outside spikers

João Pedro (BRA)
Fausto Diaz (ARG)

- Best libero

João Gameiro (BRA)

== See also ==
- 2022 Girls' U19 South American Volleyball Championship
