= 2016 Boys' Youth South American Volleyball Championship =

Tournament details
- Host country: Peru
- Dates: 5–9 October 2016
- Teams: 6
- Venue: 1

Final positions
- Champions: Argentina (4th title)

The 2016 Boys' Youth South American Volleyball Championship was the 20th edition of the Boys' Youth South American Volleyball Championship, organised by South America's governing volleyball body, the Confederación Sudamericana de Voleibol (CSV).

== Competing nations ==
The following national teams participated:

- Argentina
- Bolivia
- Brazil
- Chile
- Colombia
- Peru

== Preliminary round ==
=== Pool A ===
Pos	Team	Pld	W	L	Pts	SW	SL	SR	SPW	SPL	SPR	Qualification
1	Argentina	2	2	0	6	6	0	MAX	152	104	1.462	Semifinals
2	Colombia	2	1	1	2	5	3	1.667	157	177	0.887	Semifinals
3	Chile	2	0	2	1	2	4	0.500	152	180	0.844	5th–6th place classification

Date	Time		Score		Set 1	Set 2	Set 3	Set 4	Set 5	Total	Report
5 Oct	17:00	Chile	2–3	Colombia	18–25	25–19	24–26	25–20	8–15	100–105	
5 Oct	17:00	Colombia	0–3	Argentina	12–25	15–25	25–27			52–77	
5 Oct	17:00	Argentina	3–0	Chile	25–15	25–15	25–22			75–52	

=== Pool B ===
Pos	Team	Pld	W	L	Pts	SW	SL	SR	SPW	SPL	SPR	Qualification
1	Brazil	2	2	0	6	6	0	MAX	150	60	2.500	Semifinals
2	Bolivia	2	1	1	3	4	3	1.333	113	164	0.689	Semifinals
3	Peru	2	0	2	0	1	6	0.167	131	170	0.771	5th–6th place classification

Date	Time		Score		Set 1	Set 2	Set 3	Set 4	Set 5	Total	Report
5 Oct	19:00	Bolivia	3–1	Peru	25–16	25–23	18–25	27–25		95–89	
6 Oct	19:00	Brazil	3–0	Bolivia	25–9	25–2	25–7			75–18	
7 Oct	19:00	Peru	0–3	Brazil	14–25	10–25	18–25			42–75	

== Final round ==
=== 5th–6th classification ===
Date	Time		Score		Set 1	Set 2	Set 3	Set 4	Set 5	Total	Report
8 Oct	13:00	Chile	3–1	Peru	24–26	25–21	25–23	25–13		99–83	

=== Championship ===
Semifinals
27 August
Argentina	3
Bolivia	0
27 August
Brazil	3
Colombia	1

Final
28 August
Argentina	3
Brazil	0
Third place
28 August
Bolivia	1
Colombia	3

==== Semifinals ====
Date	Time		Score		Set 1	Set 2	Set 3	Set 4	Set 5	Total	Report
8 Oct	15:00	Argentina	3–0	Bolivia	25–9	25–15	25–15			75–39	
8 Oct	17:00	Brazil	3–1	Colombia	19–25	25–18	25–12	25–15		94–70	

==== Third place match ====
Date	Time		Score		Set 1	Set 2	Set 3	Set 4	Set 5	Total	Report
9 Oct	13:00	Bolivia	1–3	Colombia	25–19	11–25	7–25	8–25		51–94	

==== Final ====
Date	Time		Score		Set 1	Set 2	Set 3	Set 4	Set 5	Total	Report
9 Oct	15:00	Argentina	3–0	Brazil	25–18	25–23	25–15			75–56	

== Final standing ==
Rank	Team
1st place, gold medalist(s)	Argentina
2nd place, silver medalist(s)	Brazil
3rd place, bronze medalist(s)	Colombia
4	Bolivia
5	Chile
6	Peru

Qualified for the 2017 Youth World Championship
