= 2013 FIVB Volleyball Boys' U19 World Championship =

2013 Boys' U19 World Championship
Tournament details
- Host country: Mexico
- Dates: 27 June – 7 July
- Teams: 20 (from 5 confederations)
- Venue: 2 (in 2 host cities)

Final positions
- Champions: Russia (3rd title)
- Runners-up: China
- Third place: Poland
- Fourth place: Iran

Tournament awards
- MVP: (Russia) Pavel Pankov
- Best Setter: (Argentina) Matías Sanchez
- Best OH: (Russia) Dmitry Volkov (China) Tang Chuanhang
- Best MB: (Russia) Maxim Troynin (China) Zhang Zhejia
- Best OPP: (Russia) Victor Poletaev
- Best Libero: (Brazil) Rogério Carvalho

The 2013 FIVB Volleyball Boys' U19 World Championship was held in Tijuana and Mexicali, Mexico, from 27 June to 7 July 2013. This was the first edition of the tournament that features 20 teams.

== Competition formula ==
The 20 teams will be divided into four pools of five teams each and will play a round-robin tournament. The bottom-ranked team of each pool will play classification matches for 17th–20th place in a round-robin system.

The other 16 teams progress to the Eight Finals which consists of a playoff (1st of Pool A against 4th of Pool B etc.). The winners of the playoff matches will advance to the quarterfinals, semifinals and finals to be classified from 1st to 8th while the losers of playoff match will play classification matches, with a similar quarterfinals, semifinals and finals system, to be classified from 9th to 16th.

== Qualification ==
Confederation	Method of Qualification	Date	Venue	Vacancies	Qualified
	Host Country	18 March 2012		1	Mexico
NORCECA	2012 NORCECA Youth Championship	1–8 July 2012	Tijuana, Mexico	2	Cuba; United States
AVC	2012 Asian Youth Championship	23 October – 1 November 2012	Tehran, Iran	4	Iran; China; Japan; South Korea
CSV	2012 South American Youth Championship	7–11 November 2012	Santiago, Chile	3	Brazil; Argentina; Chile
CAVB	2013 African Youth Championship	22–25 January 2013	Sétif, Algeria	4	Egypt; Tunisia; Rwanda; Algeria
CEV	2013 European Youth Championship	12–21 April 2013	Laktasi, Bosnia and Herzegovina; Belgrade, Serbia	6	Russia; Poland; Belgium; Finland; Turkey; France
Total				20	

== Pools composition ==
Pool A	Pool B	Pool C	Pool D
Mexico (Hosts)	Argentina	Russia	Brazil
China	Cuba	Iran	United States
Belgium	Japan	France	Egypt
Tunisia	Chile	Rwanda	Algeria
Poland	Turkey	Finland	South Korea

== Venues ==
Pool A, C and Final round	Pool B, D and Final round
Tijuana, Mexico	Mexicali, Mexico
Centro de Alto Rendimiento de Tijuana	Auditorio del Estado
Capacity: 4,000	Capacity: 5,000

== Pool standing procedure ==
1. Match points
2. Number of matches won
3. Sets ratio
4. Points ratio
5. Result of the last match between the tied teams

Match won 3–0 or 3–1: 3 match points for the winner, 0 match points for the loser
Match won 3–2: 2 match points for the winner, 1 match point for the loser

== Preliminary round ==
- All times are Pacific Daylight Time (UTC−07:00).

=== Pool A ===
Pos	Team	Pld	W	L	Pts	SW	SL	SR	SPW	SPL	SPR	Qualification
1	Poland	4	4	0	11	12	2	6.000	327	281	1.164	Round of 16
2	China	4	3	1	10	11	3	3.667	332	270	1.230	Round of 16
3	Belgium	4	2	2	5	6	8	0.750	294	291	1.010	Round of 16
4	Mexico	4	1	3	4	5	10	0.500	309	342	0.904	Round of 16
5	Tunisia	4	0	4	0	1	12	0.083	250	328	0.762	17th–20th places

Date	Time		Score		Set 1	Set 2	Set 3	Set 4	Set 5	Total	Report
27 Jun	12:05	Tunisia	0–3	Poland	20–25	18–25	21–25			59–75	P2 P3
27 Jun	20:14	Mexico	0–3	China	19–25	15–25	18–25			52–75	P2 P3
28 Jun	12:00	Belgium	3–0	Tunisia	25–19	25–12	25–15			75–46	P2 P3
28 Jun	19:00	Poland	3–0	Mexico	25–15	25–22	25–22			75–59	P2 P3
29 Jun	12:00	China	2–3	Poland	19–25	22–25	25–21	25–13	16–18	107–102	P2 P3
29 Jun	19:40	Mexico	2–3	Belgium	25–17	25–22	20–25	14–25	11–15	95–104	P2 P3
30 Jun	12:00	Belgium	0–3	China	23–25	15–25	21–25			59–75	P2 P3
30 Jun	19:00	Tunisia	1–3	Mexico	28–30	17–25	25–23	18–25		88–103	P2 P3
1 Jul	12:00	China	3–0	Tunisia	25–14	25–22	25–21			75–57	P2 P3
1 Jul	14:00	Poland	3–0	Belgium	25–22	25–13	25–21			75–56	P2 P3

=== Pool B ===
Pos	Team	Pld	W	L	Pts	SW	SL	SR	SPW	SPL	SPR	Qualification
1	Argentina	4	4	0	11	12	2	6.000	329	263	1.251	Round of 16
2	Cuba	4	2	2	7	8	7	1.143	325	327	0.994	Round of 16
3	Chile	4	2	2	5	7	8	0.875	324	329	0.985	Round of 16
4	Turkey	4	1	3	5	7	9	0.778	344	369	0.932	Round of 16
5	Japan	4	1	3	2	3	11	0.273	301	335	0.899	17th–20th places

Date	Time		Score		Set 1	Set 2	Set 3	Set 4	Set 5	Total	Report
27 Jun	12:00	Japan	0–3	Chile	21–25	21–25	22–25			64–75	P2 P3
27 Jun	19:00	Cuba	0–3	Turkey	23–25	27–29	21–25			71–79	P2 P3
28 Jun	12:00	Turkey	2–3	Japan	26–24	26–24	17–25	24–26	17–19	110–118	P2 P3
28 Jun	14:52	Argentina	3–2	Cuba	25–17	21–25	18–25	25–10	15–10	104–87	P2 P3
29 Jun	12:00	Chile	3–2	Turkey	22–25	25–19	25–17	18–25	15–12	105–98	P2 P3
29 Jun	19:00	Japan	0–3	Argentina	21–25	17–25	19–25			57–75	P2 P3
30 Jun	12:00	Argentina	3–0	Chile	25–18	25–23	25–21			75–62	P2 P3
30 Jun	19:25	Cuba	3–0	Japan	25–19	25–23	25–20			75–62	P2 P3
1 Jul	12:00	Chile	1–3	Cuba	21–25	20–25	25–17	16–25		82–92	P2 P3
1 Jul	19:00	Turkey	0–3	Argentina	20–25	17–25	20–25			57–75	P2 P3

=== Pool C ===
Pos	Team	Pld	W	L	Pts	SW	SL	SR	SPW	SPL	SPR	Qualification
1	Russia	4	4	0	12	12	0	MAX	300	202	1.485	Round of 16
2	Iran	4	3	1	8	9	5	1.800	321	275	1.167	Round of 16
3	France	4	2	2	5	6	8	0.750	283	280	1.011	Round of 16
4	Finland	4	1	3	4	7	11	0.636	332	401	0.828	Round of 16
5	Rwanda	4	0	4	1	2	12	0.167	253	331	0.764	17th–20th places

Date	Time		Score		Set 1	Set 2	Set 3	Set 4	Set 5	Total	Report
27 Jun	13:59	Iran	3–2	Finland	25–15	25–18	21–25	25–27	15–8	111–93	P2 P3
27 Jun	17:00	France	3–0	Rwanda	25–16	25–12	25–18			75–46	P2 P3
28 Jun	14:00	Finland	2–3	France	25–21	25–23	11–25	14–25	9–15	84–109	P2 P3
28 Jun	17:00	Russia	3–0	Iran	25–19	25–22	25–19			75–60	P2 P3
29 Jun	14:40	France	0–3	Russia	16–25	17–25	13–25			46–75	P2 P3
29 Jun	17:00	Rwanda	2–3	Finland	25–21	18–25	21–25	25–16	17–19	106–106	P2 P3
30 Jun	14:00	Russia	3–0	Rwanda	25–13	25–18	25–16			75–47	P2 P3
30 Jun	17:00	Iran	3–0	France	25–20	25–18	25–15			75–53	P2 P3
1 Jul	17:00	Rwanda	0–3	Iran	19–25	19–25	16–25			54–75	P2 P3
1 Jul	19:00	Finland	0–3	Russia	14–25	15–25	20–25			49–75	P2 P3

=== Pool D ===
Pos	Team	Pld	W	L	Pts	SW	SL	SR	SPW	SPL	SPR	Qualification
1	Brazil	4	4	0	12	12	0	MAX	300	220	1.364	Round of 16
2	South Korea	4	2	2	7	8	6	1.333	317	285	1.112	Round of 16
3	Egypt	4	2	2	6	6	7	0.857	277	277	1.000	Round of 16
4	United States	4	2	2	5	7	9	0.778	341	363	0.939	Round of 16
5	Algeria	4	0	4	0	1	12	0.083	239	329	0.726	17th–20th places

Date	Time		Score		Set 1	Set 2	Set 3	Set 4	Set 5	Total	Report
27 Jun	14:00	United States	3–1	Algeria	23–25	25–16	28–26	25–17		101–84	P2 P3
27 Jun	17:00	Egypt	0–3	South Korea	21–25	14–25	20–25			55–75	P2 P3
28 Jun	17:00	Algeria	0–3	Egypt	26–28	15–25	10–25			51–78	P2 P3
28 Jun	19:31	Brazil	3–0	United States	25–18	25–21	25–21			75–60	P2 P3
29 Jun	14:34	Egypt	0–3	Brazil	16–25	16–25	14–25			46–75	P2 P3
29 Jun	17:00	South Korea	3–0	Algeria	25–22	25–14	25–15			75–51	P2 P3
30 Jun	14:00	Brazil	3–0	South Korea	25–22	25–16	25–23			75–61	P2 P3
30 Jun	17:00	United States	1–3	Egypt	18–25	25–23	16–25	17–25		76–98	P2 P3
1 Jul	14:26	South Korea	2–3	United States	25–22	20–25	21–25	25–15	15–17	106–104	P2 P3
1 Jul	17:07	Algeria	0–3	Brazil	15–25	23–25	15–25			53–75	P2 P3

== Final round ==
- All times are Pacific Daylight Time (UTC−07:00).

=== 17th–20th places ===
Pos	Team	Pld	W	L	Pts	SW	SL	SR	SPW	SPL	SPR
1	Japan	3	3	0	9	9	0	MAX	225	163	1.380
2	Tunisia	3	2	1	6	6	5	1.200	253	230	1.100
3	Algeria	3	1	2	3	4	6	0.667	212	228	0.930
4	Rwanda	3	0	3	0	1	9	0.111	181	250	0.724

Date	Time	Venue		Score		Set 1	Set 2	Set 3	Set 4	Set 5	Total	Report
4 Jul	17:00	ADE	Tunisia	0–3	Japan	22–25	21–25	16–25			59–75	P2 P3
4 Jul	19:00	ADE	Rwanda	0–3	Algeria	19–25	22–25	18–25			59–75	P2 P3
5 Jul	08:00	ADE	Tunisia	3–1	Algeria	25–15	25–18	19–25	25–19		94–77	P2 P3
5 Jul	10:15	ADE	Japan	3–0	Rwanda	25–10	25–20	25–14			75–44	P2 P3
6 Jul	08:00	ADE	Japan	3–0	Algeria	25–19	25–23	25–18			75–60	P2 P3
6 Jul	10:00	ADE	Tunisia	3–1	Rwanda	25–15	27–25	23–25	25–13		100–78	P2 P3

=== Final sixteen ===
Round of 16
3 July – Tijuana
Argentina	3
Mexico	0
3 July – Mexicali
Iran	3
Egypt	1
3 July – Tijuana
Cuba	3
Belgium	0
3 July – Mexicali
Russia	3
United States	0
3 July – Mexicali
Brazil	3
Finland	2
3 July – Tijuana
China	3
Chile	0
3 July – Mexicali
South Korea	0
France	3
3 July – Tijuana
Poland	3
Turkey	1

Quarterfinals
5 July – Tijuana
Argentina	1
Iran	3
5 July – Tijuana
Cuba	1
Russia	3
5 July – Tijuana
Brazil	0
China	3
5 July – Tijuana
France	0
Poland	3

Semifinals
6 July – Tijuana
Iran	0
Russia	3
6 July – Tijuana
China	3
Poland	1

Final
7 July – Tijuana
Russia	3
China	1
3rd place match
7 July – Tijuana
Iran	1
Poland	3

5th–8th semifinals
6 July – Tijuana
Argentina	3
Cuba	2
6 July – Tijuana
Brazil	3
France	1

5th place match
7 July – Tijuana
Argentina	1
Brazil	3
7th place match
7 July – Tijuana
Cuba	3
France	2

9th–16th quarterfinals
5 July – Mexicali
Mexico	1
Egypt	3
5 July – Mexicali
Belgium	3
United States	1
5 July – Mexicali
Finland	3
Chile	1
5 July – Mexicali
South Korea	3
Turkey	0

9th–12th semifinals
6 July – Mexicali
Egypt	0
Belgium	3
6 July – Mexicali
Finland	1
South Korea	3

9th place match
7 July – Mexicali
Belgium	3
South Korea	0
11th place match
7 July – Mexicali
Egypt	1
Finland	3

13th–16th semifinals
6 July – Mexicali
Mexico	3
United States	2
6 July – Mexicali
Chile	3
Turkey	1

13th place match
7 July – Mexicali
Mexico	2
Chile	3
15th place match
7 July – Mexicali
United States	1
Turkey	3

==== Round of 16 ====
Date	Time	Venue		Score		Set 1	Set 2	Set 3	Set 4	Set 5	Total	Report
3 Jul	12:00	CAR	Argentina	3–0	Mexico	25–16	25–14	25–20			75–50	P2 P3
3 Jul	12:00	ADE	Iran	3–1	Egypt	25–14	25–21	20–25	25–23		95–83	P2 P3
3 Jul	14:00	CAR	Cuba	3–0	Belgium	26–24	25–21	25–20			76–65	P2 P3
3 Jul	14:25	ADE	Russia	3–0	United States	25–18	25–16	25–19			75–53	P2 P3
3 Jul	17:00	ADE	Brazil	3–2	Finland	25–20	25–12	29–31	27–29	15–11	121–103	P2 P3
3 Jul	17:00	CAR	China	3–0	Chile	25–17	25–20	25–17			75–54	P2 P3
3 Jul	19:00	CAR	Poland	3–1	Turkey	26–24	25–19	25–27	26–24		102–94	P2 P3
3 Jul	19:57	ADE	South Korea	0–3	France	23–25	19–25	17–25			59–75	P2 P3

==== 9th–16th quarterfinals ====
Date	Time	Venue		Score		Set 1	Set 2	Set 3	Set 4	Set 5	Total	Report
5 Jul	13:00	ADE	Mexico	1–3	Egypt	25–20	18–25	18–25	27–29		88–99	P2 P3
5 Jul	15:37	ADE	Belgium	3–1	United States	23–25	25–17	25–17	25–16		98–75	P2 P3
5 Jul	18:00	ADE	Finland	3–1	Chile	25–23	12–25	25–19	25–23		87–90	P2 P3
5 Jul	20:28	ADE	South Korea	3–0	Turkey	25–23	25–17	25–22			75–62	P2 P3

==== Quarterfinals ====
Date	Time	Venue		Score		Set 1	Set 2	Set 3	Set 4	Set 5	Total	Report
5 Jul	12:00	CAR	Argentina	1–3	Iran	25–23	20–25	27–29	23–25		95–102	P2 P3
5 Jul	14:29	CAR	Cuba	1–3	Russia	25–23	21–25	16–25	22–25		84–98	P2 P3
5 Jul	17:00	CAR	Brazil	0–3	China	32–34	16–25	22–25			70–84	P2 P3
5 Jul	19:00	CAR	France	0–3	Poland	19–25	19–25	22–25			60–75	P2 P3

==== 13th–16th semifinals ====
Date	Time	Venue		Score		Set 1	Set 2	Set 3	Set 4	Set 5	Total	Report
6 Jul	13:00	ADE	Mexico	3–2	United States	25–20	26–28	20–25	25–21	15–13	111–107	P2 P3
6 Jul	16:00	ADE	Chile	3–1	Turkey	32–30	25–22	14–25	25–14		96–91	P2 P3

==== 9th–12th semifinals ====
Date	Time	Venue		Score		Set 1	Set 2	Set 3	Set 4	Set 5	Total	Report
6 Jul	18:28	ADE	Egypt	0–3	Belgium	22–25	23–25	17–25			62–75	P2 P3
6 Jul	20:20	ADE	Finland	1–3	South Korea	25–18	20–25	20–25	24–26		89–94	P2 P3

==== 5th–8th semifinals ====
Date	Time	Venue		Score		Set 1	Set 2	Set 3	Set 4	Set 5	Total	Report
6 Jul	12:00	CAR	Argentina	3–2	Cuba	27–25	25–19	14–25	22–25	15–11	103–105	P2 P3
6 Jul	14:38	CAR	Brazil	3–1	France	17–25	25–12	25–22	25–21		92–80	P2 P3

==== Semifinals ====
Date	Time	Venue		Score		Set 1	Set 2	Set 3	Set 4	Set 5	Total	Report
6 Jul	17:00	CAR	Iran	0–3	Russia	23–25	16–25	14–25			53–75	P2 P3
6 Jul	19:00	CAR	China	3–1	Poland	32–30	25–18	21–25	25–22		103–95	P2 P3

==== 15th place match ====
Date	Time	Venue		Score		Set 1	Set 2	Set 3	Set 4	Set 5	Total	Report
7 Jul	08:00	ADE	United States	1–3	Turkey	20–25	17–25	25–15	19–25		81–90	P2 P3

==== 13th place match ====
Date	Time	Venue		Score		Set 1	Set 2	Set 3	Set 4	Set 5	Total	Report
7 Jul	10:06	ADE	Mexico	2–3	Chile	25–27	25–23	25–20	25–27	13–15	113–112	P2 P3

==== 11th place match ====
Date	Time	Venue		Score		Set 1	Set 2	Set 3	Set 4	Set 5	Total	Report
7 Jul	13:11	ADE	Egypt	1–3	Finland	19–25	25–23	21–25	13–25		78–98	P2 P3

==== 9th place match ====
Date	Time	Venue		Score		Set 1	Set 2	Set 3	Set 4	Set 5	Total	Report
7 Jul	15:29	ADE	Belgium	3–0	South Korea	25–21	25–16	25–18			75–55	P2 P3

==== 7th place match ====
Date	Time	Venue		Score		Set 1	Set 2	Set 3	Set 4	Set 5	Total	Report
7 Jul	12:00	CAR	Cuba	3–2	France	25–17	25–21	21–25	25–27	15–8	111–98	P2 P3

==== 5th place match ====
Date	Time	Venue		Score		Set 1	Set 2	Set 3	Set 4	Set 5	Total	Report
7 Jul	14:35	CAR	Argentina	1–3	Brazil	25–15	21–25	19–25	23–25		88–90	P2 P3

==== 3rd place match ====
Date	Time	Venue		Score		Set 1	Set 2	Set 3	Set 4	Set 5	Total	Report
7 Jul	17:00	CAR	Iran	1–3	Poland	25–19	21–25	19–25	17–25		82–94	P2 P3

==== Final ====
Date	Time	Venue		Score		Set 1	Set 2	Set 3	Set 4	Set 5	Total	Report
7 Jul	19:08	CAR	Russia	3–1	China	25–23	22–25	25–17	25–14		97–79	P2 P3

== Final standing ==
Rank	Team
1st place, gold medalist(s)	Russia
2nd place, silver medalist(s)	China
3rd place, bronze medalist(s)	Poland
4	Iran
5	Brazil
6	Argentina
7	Cuba
8	France
9	Belgium
10	South Korea
11	Finland
12	Egypt
13	Chile
14	Mexico
15	Turkey
16	United States
17	Japan
18	Tunisia
19	Algeria
20	Rwanda

2013 Boys' U19 World champions

Russia
3rd title

12–man roster
Aleksandr Goncharov, Maxim Troynin, Victor Poletaev (c), Nikita Vishnevetskiy, Nikolai Chepura, Roman Zhos, Evgenii Andreev, Maxim Belogortcev, Pavel Pankov, Dmitrii Triapkin, Dmitry Volkov, Andrey Surmachevskiy
Head coach
Aleksandr Karikov

== Awards ==
- Most valuable player
  (Russia) Pavel Pankov
- Best setter
  (Argentina) Matías Sánchez
- Best Outside Spikers
  (Russia) Dmitry Volkov
  (China) Tang Chuanhang
- Best Middle Blockers
  (Russia) Maxim Troynin
  (China) Zhang Zhejia
- Best opposite spiker
  (Russia) Victor Poletaev
- Best libero
  (Brazil) Rogério Carvalho
