= 2011 FIVB Volleyball Boys' U19 World Championship =

2011 Boys' Youth World Championship
Tournament details
- Host country: Argentina
- Dates: 19–28 August
- Teams: 16
- Venues: 2 (in 2 host cities)

Final positions
- Champions: Serbia (2nd title)

Tournament awards
- MVP: (Serbia) Uroš Kovačević

The 2011 FIVB Volleyball Boys' Youth World Championship was held in Bahía Blanca and Burzaco, Argentina from 19 to 28 August 2011. Sixteen teams participated in the tournament.

== Pools composition ==
Pool A	Pool B	Pool C	Pool D
Argentina; United States; Egypt; Bulgaria	Russia; Tunisia; China; Greece	Cuba; Brazil; South Korea; France	Iran; Serbia; Puerto Rico; Spain

== Venues ==
- Estadio Osvaldo Casanova, Bahía Blanca, Argentina – Pool B, D, E, F, 5th–8th places and Championship
- Polideportivo Almirante Brown, Burzaco, Argentina – Pool A, C, G, H, 13th–16th places and 9th–12th places

== Pool standing procedure ==
1. Match points
2. Number of matches won
3. Sets ratio
4. Points ratio
5. Result of the last match between the tied teams

Match won 3–0 or 3–1: 3 match points for the winner, 0 match points for the loser
Match won 3–2: 2 match points for the winner, 1 match point for the loser

== First round ==
=== Pool A ===
Pos	Team	Pld	W	L	Pts	SW	SL	SR	SPW	SPL	SPR	Qualification
1	Argentina	3	2	1	7	8	3	2.667	250	237	1.055	Pool E or Pool F
2	Bulgaria	3	2	1	5	7	6	1.167	291	281	1.036	Pool E or Pool F
3	Egypt	3	1	2	4	5	6	0.833	277	283	0.979	Pool G or Pool H
4	United States	3	1	2	2	4	8	0.500	280	297	0.943	Pool G or Pool H

Date		Score		Set 1	Set 2	Set 3	Set 4	Set 5	Total
19 Aug	United States	3–2	Egypt	25–16	25–21	27–29	34–36	17–15	128–117
19 Aug	Argentina	2–3	Bulgaria	25–23	23–25	25–21	16–25	8–15	97–109
20 Aug	United States	1–3	Bulgaria	22–25	29–27	16–25	20–25		87–102
20 Aug	Argentina	3–0	Egypt	25–22	25–19	25–22			75–63
21 Aug	Bulgaria	1–3	Egypt	25–22	22–25	16–25	17–25		80–97
21 Aug	Argentina	3–0	United States	25–20	25–19	28–26			78–65

=== Pool B ===
Pos	Team	Pld	W	L	Pts	SW	SL	SR	SPW	SPL	SPR	Qualification
1	Greece	3	3	0	9	9	0	MAX	232	165	1.406	Pool E or Pool F
2	China	3	2	1	4	6	7	0.857	260	283	0.919	Pool E or Pool F
3	Russia	3	1	2	4	5	6	0.833	245	227	1.079	Pool G or Pool H
4	Tunisia	3	0	3	1	2	9	0.222	203	262	0.775	Pool G or Pool H

Date		Score		Set 1	Set 2	Set 3	Set 4	Set 5	Total
19 Aug	Russia	0–3	Greece	12–25	23–25	30–32			65–82
19 Aug	China	3–2	Tunisia	26–24	21–25	25–27	25–21	15–6	112–106
20 Aug	China	0–3	Greece	14–25	22–25	12–25			48–75
20 Aug	Russia	3–0	Tunisia	25–12	25–19	25–14			75–45
21 Aug	Tunisia	0–3	Greece	22–25	10–25	20–25			52–75
21 Aug	Russia	2–3	China	22–25	25–17	25–18	20–25	13–15	105–100

=== Pool C ===
Pos	Team	Pld	W	L	Pts	SW	SL	SR	SPW	SPL	SPR	Qualification
1	Cuba	3	3	0	7	9	5	1.800	308	297	1.037	Pool E or Pool F
2	France	3	2	1	5	7	5	1.400	254	264	0.962	Pool E or Pool F
3	Brazil	3	1	2	4	7	8	0.875	321	287	1.118	Pool G or Pool H
4	South Korea	3	0	3	2	4	9	0.444	266	297	0.896	Pool G or Pool H

Date		Score		Set 1	Set 2	Set 3	Set 4	Set 5	Total
19 Aug	Brazil	3–2	South Korea	25–19	25–14	23–25	20–25	15–9	108–92
19 Aug	France	1–3	Cuba	20–25	25–16	21–25	21–25		87–91
20 Aug	France	3–0	South Korea	29–27	25–20	25–22			79–69
20 Aug	Brazil	2–3	Cuba	25–21	25–19	21–25	25–27	13–15	107–109
21 Aug	France	3–2	Brazil	14–25	25–20	9–25	25–22	15–12	88–104
21 Aug	Cuba	3–2	South Korea	24–26	25–21	21–25	25–20	15–13	110–105

=== Pool D ===
Pos	Team	Pld	W	L	Pts	SW	SL	SR	SPW	SPL	SPR	Qualification
1	Spain	3	2	1	6	7	3	2.333	246	220	1.118	Pool E or Pool F
2	Serbia	3	2	1	6	7	4	1.750	267	245	1.090	Pool E or Pool F
3	Iran	3	2	1	6	6	4	1.500	236	216	1.093	Pool G or Pool H
4	Puerto Rico	3	0	3	0	0	9	0.000	157	225	0.698	Pool G or Pool H

Date		Score		Set 1	Set 2	Set 3	Set 4	Set 5	Total
19 Aug	Serbia	3–0	Puerto Rico	25–16	25–22	25–20			75–58
19 Aug	Iran	0–3	Spain	22–25	25–27	21–25			77–68
20 Aug	Spain	3–0	Puerto Rico	25–21	25–17	25–15			75–53
20 Aug	Serbia	1–3	Iran	22–25	25–13	28–30	18–25		93–93
21 Aug	Serbia	3–1	Spain	21–25	28–26	25–22	25–21		99–94
21 Aug	Iran	3–0	Puerto Rico	25–15	25–12	25–19			75–46

== Second round ==
=== Pool E ===
Pos	Team	Pld	W	L	Pts	SW	SL	SR	SPW	SPL	SPR	Qualification
1	Serbia	3	3	0	8	9	4	2.250	302	259	1.166	Semifinals
2	Cuba	3	2	1	5	7	6	1.167	289	275	1.051	Semifinals
3	Argentina	3	1	2	4	6	7	0.857	277	289	0.958	5th–8th place
4	China	3	0	3	1	4	9	0.444	254	299	0.849	5th–8th place

Date		Score		Set 1	Set 2	Set 3	Set 4	Set 5	Total
24 Aug	Cuba	3–2	China	25–18	20–25	25–14	23–25	17–15	110–97
24 Aug	Serbia	3–2	Argentina	23–25	25–21	25–22	22–25	15–9	110–102
25 Aug	Serbia	3–1	Cuba	22–25	25–19	25–23	25–15		97–82
25 Aug	Argentina	3–1	China	25–23	19–25	25–15	25–19		94–82
26 Aug	Cuba	3–1	Argentina	25–22	22–25	25–17	25–17		97–81
26 Aug	Serbia	3–1	China	25–15	20–25	25–15	25–20		95–75

=== Pool F ===
Pos	Team	Pld	W	L	Pts	SW	SL	SR	SPW	SPL	SPR	Qualification
1	Spain	3	3	0	8	9	3	3.000	275	244	1.127	Semifinals
2	France	3	2	1	6	8	6	1.333	303	281	1.078	Semifinals
3	Bulgaria	3	1	2	4	6	6	1.000	254	269	0.944	5th–8th place
4	Greece	3	0	3	0	1	9	0.111	212	250	0.848	5th–8th place

Date		Score		Set 1	Set 2	Set 3	Set 4	Set 5	Total
24 Aug	Spain	3–1	Bulgaria	22–25	25–19	25–18	25–17		97–79
24 Aug	Greece	1–3	France	25–19	14–25	20–25	24–26		83–95
25 Aug	France	2–3	Spain	22–25	17–25	25–18	25–15	10–15	99–98
25 Aug	Greece	0–3	Bulgaria	23–25	19–25	21–25			63–75
26 Aug	France	3–2	Bulgaria	22–25	22–25	25–17	25–22	15–11	109–100
26 Aug	Greece	0–3	Spain	19–25	28–30	19–25			66–80

=== Pool G ===
Pos	Team	Pld	W	L	Pts	SW	SL	SR	SPW	SPL	SPR	Qualification
1	Brazil	3	3	0	9	9	1	9.000	246	176	1.398	9th–12th place
2	Egypt	3	2	1	6	6	5	1.200	235	250	0.940	9th–12th place
3	Tunisia	3	1	2	3	5	6	0.833	240	249	0.964	13th–16th place
4	Puerto Rico	3	0	3	0	1	9	0.111	194	240	0.808	13th–16th place

Date		Score		Set 1	Set 2	Set 3	Set 4	Set 5	Total
24 Aug	Brazil	3–1	Tunisia	25–15	21–25	25–12	25–21		96–73
24 Aug	Egypt	3–1	Puerto Rico	15–25	25–22	25–19	25–17		90–83
25 Aug	Brazil	3–0	Puerto Rico	25–17	25–16	25–18			75–51
25 Aug	Tunisia	1–3	Egypt	19–25	22–25	25–15	26–28		92–93
26 Aug	Brazil	3–0	Egypt	25–18	25–14	25–20			75–52
26 Aug	Tunisia	3–0	Puerto Rico	25–21	25–18	25–21			75–60

=== Pool H ===
Pos	Team	Pld	W	L	Pts	SW	SL	SR	SPW	SPL	SPR	Qualification
1	Iran	3	3	0	9	9	2	4.500	269	220	1.223	9th–12th place
2	United States	3	1	2	3	6	8	0.750	287	301	0.953	9th–12th place
3	South Korea	3	1	2	3	6	8	0.750	283	298	0.950	13th–16th place
4	Russia	3	1	2	3	5	8	0.625	259	279	0.928	13th–16th place

Date		Score		Set 1	Set 2	Set 3	Set 4	Set 5	Total
24 Aug	Iran	3–1	United States	25–21	22–25	25–16	25–18		97–80
24 Aug	Russia	3–2	South Korea	25–20	19–25	18–25	25–16	15–10	102–96
25 Aug	Iran	3–1	South Korea	21–25	25–17	25–20	25–22		96–84
25 Aug	Russia	2–3	United States	20–25	25–20	18–25	25–22	13–15	101–107
26 Aug	Iran	3–0	Russia	25–12	26–24	25–20			76–56
26 Aug	South Korea	3–2	United States	25–20	20–25	18–25	25–19	15–11	103–100

== Final round ==
=== Classification 13th–16th ===
Date		Score		Set 1	Set 2	Set 3	Set 4	Set 5	Total
27 Aug	Russia	3–1	Tunisia	25–19	21–25	25–16	25–20		96–80
27 Aug	South Korea	3–1	Puerto Rico	25–23	18–25	25–17	32–30		100–95

=== Classification 9th–12th ===
Date		Score		Set 1	Set 2	Set 3	Set 4	Set 5	Total
27 Aug	Brazil	3–1	United States	25–20	25–23	23–25	25–19		98–84
27 Aug	Iran	3–0	Egypt	25–21	25–14	25–21			75–56

=== Classification 5th–8th ===
Date		Score		Set 1	Set 2	Set 3	Set 4	Set 5	Total
27 Aug	China	0–3	Bulgaria	20–25	24–26	18–25			62–76
27 Aug	Argentina	3–0	Greece	25–22	25–21	25–21			75–64

=== Classification 1st–4th ===
Date		Score		Set 1	Set 2	Set 3	Set 4	Set 5	Total
27 Aug	Cuba	1–3	Spain	25–27	22–25	25–16	24–26		96–94
27 Aug	Serbia	3–0	France	25–23	25–22	25–18			75–63

=== 15th place match ===
Date		Score		Set 1	Set 2	Set 3	Set 4	Set 5	Total
28 Aug	Tunisia	1–3	Puerto Rico	24–26	22–25	25–21	23–25		94–97

=== 13th place match ===
Date		Score		Set 1	Set 2	Set 3	Set 4	Set 5	Total
28 Aug	Russia	3–1	South Korea	25–18	25–18	25–27	25–15		100–78

=== 11th place match ===
Date		Score		Set 1	Set 2	Set 3	Set 4	Set 5	Total
28 Aug	United States	3–1	Egypt	29–27	23–25	25–20	25–20		101–92

=== 9th place match ===
Date		Score		Set 1	Set 2	Set 3	Set 4	Set 5	Total
28 Aug	Iran	2–3	Brazil	37–39	28–26	24–26	25–18	11–15	125–124

=== 7th place match ===
Date		Score		Set 1	Set 2	Set 3	Set 4	Set 5	Total
28 Aug	China	0–3	Greece	17–25	21–25	15–25			53–75

=== 5th place match ===
Date		Score		Set 1	Set 2	Set 3	Set 4	Set 5	Total
28 Aug	Argentina	3–0	Bulgaria	25–20	25–11	25–19			75–50

=== 3rd place match ===
Date		Score		Set 1	Set 2	Set 3	Set 4	Set 5	Total
28 Aug	Cuba	3–0	France	25–18	25–17	25–21			75–56

=== Final ===
Date		Score		Set 1	Set 2	Set 3	Set 4	Set 5	Total
28 Aug	Serbia	3–2	Spain	25–23	25–19	28–30	16–25	15–11	109–108

== Final standing ==
Rank	Team
1st place, gold medalist(s)	Serbia
2nd place, silver medalist(s)	Spain
3rd place, bronze medalist(s)	Cuba
4	France
5	Argentina
6	Bulgaria
7	Greece
8	China
9	Brazil
10	Iran
11	United States
12	Egypt
13	Russia
14	South Korea
15	Puerto Rico
16	Tunisia

2011 Boys' Youth World champions

Serbia
2nd title

Team roster

Uroš Kovačević, Luka Medić, Lazar Ilincić, Aleksa Brdjović, Cedomir Stanković, Milan Katić, Aleksandar Okolić, Sasa Popović, Mihajlo Stanković, Dimitrije Pantić, Sinisa Zarković and Aleksandar Blagojević

Head Coach: Milan Đuričić.

== Individual awards ==
- Most valuable player:Uroš Kovačević (SRB)
- Best scorer:Andres Villena (ESP)
- Best spiker:Lazaro Fundora (CUB)
- Best blocker:Alejandro Vigil (ESP)
- Best server:Yordan Bisset (CUB)
- Best libero:Quentin Richard (FRA)
- Best setter:Antoine Brizard (FRA)
- Best Diggers:Dimitrios Zisis (GRE)
- Best Receivers:Ramiro Núñez (ARG)
