= Boys' U19 NORCECA Continental Championship =

Volleyball Championship

The NORCECA Boy's Youth Continental Championship U-19 is a volleyball competition for national teams, currently held biannually and organized by the NORCECA, the North America, Central America and Caribbean volleyball federation. Men's under-19 teams play in the competition.

== History ==
NORCECA Championship
Year	Host	Gold	Silver	Bronze
1998; Details	Dominican Republic	Dominican Republic	Mexico	Puerto Rico
2000; Details	Mexico	Mexico	Puerto Rico	Canada
2002; Details	Dominican Republic	Puerto Rico	United States	Mexico
2004; Details	Mexico	Cuba	Canada	Mexico
2006; Details	Dominican Republic	Puerto Rico	United States	Cuba
2008; Details	United States	United States	Puerto Rico	Mexico
2010; Details	Mexico	Cuba	United States	Puerto Rico
2012; Details	Mexico	Cuba	Mexico	United States
2014; Details	United States	United States	Cuba	Mexico
2016; Details	Cuba	Cuba	United States	Mexico
2018; Details	Costa Rica	Cuba	United States	Puerto Rico
2024; Details	Puerto Rico	United States	Cuba	Puerto Rico
2026; Details	Canada	Canada	United States	Mexico

== Medal table ==
Rank	Nation	Gold	Silver	Bronze	Total
1	Cuba	5	2	1	8
2	United States	3	6	1	10
3	Puerto Rico	2	2	4	8
4	Mexico	1	2	6	9
5	Canada	1	1	1	3
6	Dominican Republic	1	0	0	1
Totals (6 entries)		13	13	13	39

== See also ==
- Girls' Youth NORCECA Volleyball Championship
