= Boys' Youth Pan-American Volleyball Cup =

Recurring volleyball competition

- Current season, competition or edition: 2025 Boys U19 NORCECA Pan American Cup
- Sport: Volleyball
- Founded: 2011; 15 years ago
- First season: 2011
- No. of teams: 8
- Continent: Pan American (NORCECA)
- Most recent champions: United States (3rd title)
- Most titles: United States (3 titles)

The Boys' Youth Pan-American Volleyball Cup is a bi-annual Continental Cup organized by NORCECA for U19 teams from North- and Central America, and the Caribbean.

== History ==
U19 Pan-American Cup
Year	Host	Champion	Runner-up	3rd Place
2011; Details	Mexicali, Mexico	Brazil	Puerto Rico	United States
2017; Details	Monterrey, Mexico	Mexico	Chile	Puerto Rico
2019; Details	Santo Domingo, Dominican Republic	Cuba	Mexico	Dominican Republic
2022; Details	Guatemala City, Guatemala	United States	Mexico	Puerto Rico
2023; Details	Guatemala City, Guatemala	United States	Mexico	Puerto Rico
2025; Details	Cuernavaca, Mexico	United States	Mexico	Canada

== Medal table ==
Rank	Nation	Gold	Silver	Bronze	Total
1	United States	3	0	1	4
2	Mexico	1	4	0	5
3	Brazil	1	0	0	1
3	Cuba	1	0	0	1
5	Puerto Rico	0	1	3	4
6	Chile	0	1	0	1
7	Canada	0	0	1	1
7	Dominican Republic	0	0	1	1
Totals (8 entries)		6	6	6	18

== Participating nations ==
Nation	(Mexico) 2011	(Mexico) 2017	(Dominican Republic) 2019	(Guatemala) 2022	(Guatemala) 2023	(Mexico) 2025	Years
Belize	–	–	–	–	7th	–	1
Brazil	1st	–	–	–	–	–	1
Canada	–	–	–	–	–	3rd	1
Chile	–	2nd	4th	4th	–	6th	4
Colombia	–	4th	–	–	–	–	1
Costa Rica	5th	6th	–	5th	4th	–	4
Cuba	–	–	1st	–	–	–	1
Dominican Republic	–	5th	3rd	7th	–	–	3
Guatemala	–	–	6th	6th	5th	–	3
Honduras	–	–	–	8th	–	–	1
Jamaica	–	8th	–	–	–	–	1
Mexico	5th	1st	2nd	2nd	2nd	2nd	6
Nicaragua	–	7th	7th	–	6th	–	3
Panama	–	–	–	–	–	7th	1
Peru	–	9th	–	–	–	–	1
Puerto Rico	2nd	3rd	5th	3rd	3rd	5th	6
Suriname	–	–	–	–	8th	8th	2
Trinidad and Tobago	6th	–	–	–	–	–	1
United States	3rd	–	–	1st	1st	1st	4
Venezuela	–	–	–	–	–	4th	1
Total	6	9	7	8	8	8	

== See also ==
- Men's Pan-American Volleyball Cup
- Men's Junior Pan-American Volleyball Cup
- Girls' Youth Pan-American Volleyball Cup
