= 2018 in volleyball =

The following were the events of volleyball for the year 2018 throughout the world.

== Beach volleyball ==
=== World and continental beach volleyball events ===
- July 9–13: 2018 World University Beach Volleyball Championship in Munich
  - Winners: Germany (Dan John & Eric Stadie) (m) / Canada (Nicole McNamara & Megan McNamara) (f)
- July 10–15: 2018 FIVB Beach Volleyball U19 World Championships in (China) Nanjing
  - Winners: Russia (Denis Shekunov & Dmitrii Veretiuk) (m) / Russia (Mariia Bocharova & Maria Voronina) (f)
- July 15–22: 2018 European Beach Volleyball Championships in The Hague, Rotterdam, Utrecht, & Apeldoorn
  - Winners: Norway (Anders Mol & Christian Sørum) (m) / Netherlands (Sanne Keizer & Madelein Meppelink) (f)
- August 14–19: 2018 Swatch FIVB World Tour Finals in (Germany) Hamburg
  - Winners: Norway (Anders Mol & Christian Sørum) (m) / Brazil (Ágatha Bednarczuk & Eduarda Santos Lisboa) (f)

=== FIVB Beach Volleyball World Tour ===
- January 3 – TBD: 2018 FIVB Beach Volleyball World Tour

==== 2018 Swatch Major Series (Five Star BV events) ====
- February 27 – March 4: Major #1 in Fort Lauderdale, Florida
  - Winners: United States (Phil Dalhausser & Nick Lucena) (m) / Brazil (Bárbara Seixas & Fernanda Alves) (f)
- July 10–15: Major #2 in (Switzerland) Gstaad
  - Winners: Norway (Anders Berntsen Mol & Christian Sandlie Sørum) (m) / Canada (Sarah Pavan & Melissa Humana-Paredes) (f)
- July 31 – August 5: Major #3 (final) in (Austria) Vienna
  - Winners: Norway (Anders Berntsen Mol & Christian Sandlie Sørum) (m) / Czech Republic (Barbora Hermannová & Markéta Sluková) (f)

==== 2018 Four Star BV events ====
- January 3–7: Four Star #1 in (Netherlands) The Hague
  - Winners: Latvia (Mārtiņš Pļaviņš & Edgars Tocs) (m) / United States (April Ross & Alix Klineman) (f)
- March 6–10: Four Star #2 in (Qatar) Doha (men only)
  - Winners: Netherlands (Alexander Brouwer & Robert Meeuwsen)
- April 18–22: Four Star #3 in (China) Xiamen
  - Winners: Russia (Oleg Stoyanovskiy & Igor Velichko) (m) / Canada (Sarah Pavan & Melissa Humana-Paredes) (f)
- May 1–6: Four Star #4 in (United States) Huntington Beach, California
  - Winners: Netherlands (Alexander Brouwer & Robert Meeuwsen) (m) / Brazil (Bárbara Seixas & Fernanda Alves) (f)
- May 15–20: Four Star #5 in Itapema
  - Winners: Brazil (André Stein & Evandro Oliveira) (m) / Brazil (Ágatha Bednarczuk & Eduarda Santos Lisboa) (f)
- June 19–24: Four Star #6 in Ostrava
  - Winners: Spain (Pablo Herrera & Adrián Gavira) (m) / Czech Republic (Barbora Hermannová & Markéta Sluková) (f)
- June 27 – July 1: Four Star #7 in Warsaw
  - Winners: Poland (Piotr Kantor & Bartosz Łosiak) (m) / Canada (Heather Bansley & Brandie Wilkerson) (f)
- July 4–8: Four Star #8 in (Portugal) Espinho
  - Winners: Latvia (Jānis Šmēdiņš & Aleksandrs Samoilovs) (m) / Australia (Taliqua Clancy & Mariafe Artacho del Solar) (f)
- August 7–12: Four Star #9 in (Russia) Moscow
  - Winners: Latvia (Jānis Šmēdiņš & Aleksandrs Samoilovs) (m) / United States (Summer Ross & Sara Hughes) (f)
- October 9–14: Four Star #10 in (China) Yangzhou
  - Winners: Russia (Ilya Leshukov & Konstantin Semenov) (m) / United States (April Ross & Alix Klineman) (f)
- October 16–21: Four Star #11 (final) in (United States) Las Vegas
  - Winners: Norway (Anders Berntsen Mol & Christian Sandlie Sørum) (m) / Canada (Heather Bansley & Brandie Wilkerson) (f)

==== 2018 Three Star BV events ====
- February 20–24: Three Star #1 in (Iran) Kish Island (men only)
  - Winners: Poland (Mariusz Prudel & Jakub Szalankiewicz)
- May 2–6: Three Star #2 in (Turkey) Mersin
  - Winners: Russia (Ilya Leshukov & Konstantin Semenov) (m) / Austria (Katharina Schützenhöfer & Lena Plesiutschnig) (f)
- May 9–13: Three Star #3 in (Switzerland) Lucerne
  - Winners: United States (John Mayer & Trevor Crabb) (m) / Australia (Mariafe Artacho del Solar & Taliqua Clancy) (f)
- July 18–22: Three Star #4 in (China) Haiyang
  - Winners: Austria (Robin Seidl & Philipp Waller) (m) / United States (Betsi Flint & Emily Day) (f)
- July 24–29: Three Star #5 in (Japan) Tokyo
  - Winners: Chile (Marco Grimalt & Esteban Grimalt) (m) / Germany (Teresa Mersmann & Cinja Tillmann) (f)
- September 30 – October 4: Three Star #6 in (China) Qinzhou
  - Winners: United States (Tri Bourne & Trevor Crabb) (m) / Brazil (Ana Patricia Silva Ramos & Rebecca Cavalcanti Barbosa Silva) (f)
- October 23–28: Three Star #7 (final) in (Mexico) Chetumal (women only)
  - Winners: Canada (Heather Bansley & Brandie Wilkerson)

==== 2018 Two Star BV events ====
- May 4–6: Two Star #1 in (Cambodia) Phnom Penh (women only)
  - Winners: Germany (Anna Behlen & Sarah Schneider)
- May 31 – June 3: Two Star #2 in (China) Jinjiang
  - Winners: United States (Trevor Crabb, Jr. & John Mayer) (m) / Japan (Sayaka Mizoe & Suzuka Hashimoto) (f)
- June 7–10: Two Star #3 in (China) Nantong (women only)
  - Winners: Brazil (Josemari Alves & Liliane Maestrini)
- June 14–17: Two Star #4 in (China) Tangshan (women only)
  - Winners: Brazil (Josemari Alves & Liliane Maestrini)
- June 21–24: Two Star #5 in Singapore
  - Winners: China (GAO Peng & LI Yang) (m) / Japan (Chiyo Suzuki & Reika Murakami) (f)
- July 25–29: Two Star #6 in (Morocco) Agadir
  - Winners: Russia (Maksim Hudyakov & Ruslan Bykanov) (m) / Italy (Marta Menegatti & Viktoria Orsi Toth) (f)
- September 14–16: Two Star #7 (final) in Zhongwei (women only)
  - Winners: China (WEN Shuhui & WANG Jingzhe)

==== 2018 One Star BV events ====
- February 1–4: One Star #1 in (Australia) Shepparton
  - Winners: United States (Chase Frishman & James Avery Drost) (m) / United States (Amanda Dowdy & Irene Pollock) (f)
- March 14–17: One Star #2 in (Oman) Muscat (men only)
  - Winners: Germany (Philipp Arne Bergmann & Yannick Harms)
- March 15–18: One Star #3 in Aalsmeer (men only)
  - Winners: Netherlands (Alexander Brouwer & Robert Meeuwsen)
- April 8–11: One Star #4 in Satun
  - Winners: Thailand (Nuttanon Inkiew & Sedtawat Padsawud) (m) / United States (Caitlin Ledoux & Emily Stockman) (f)
- April 26–29: One Star #5 in (Malaysia) Langkawi
  - Winners: Austria (Simon Frühbauer & Jörg Wutzl) (m) / Russia (Daria Mastikova & Ksenia Dabizha) (f)
- May 3–6: One Star #6 in (Philippines) Manila
  - Winners: Germany (Max-Jonas Karpa & Milan Sievers) (m) / Japan (Takemi Nishibori & Ayumi Kusano) (f)
- May 9–12: One Star #7 in (Vietnam) Tuần Châu (women only)
  - Winners: Japan (Sayaka Mizoe & Suzuka Hashimoto)
- May 10–13: One Star #8 in (Thailand) Bangkok
  - Winners: Japan (Takumi Takahashi & Yusuke Ishijima) (m) / United States (Bree Scarbrough & Aurora Davis) (f)
- May 17–20: One Star #9 in (Turkey) Aydın
  - Winners: Serbia (Stefan Basta & Lazar Kolaric) (m) / Cuba (Mailen Deliz Tamayo & Leila Consuelo Martinez Ortega) (f)
- May 24–27: One Star #10 in Miguel Pereira
  - Winners: Brazil (Vinicius Rezende Costa Freitas & Luciano Ferreira de Paula) (m) / Romania (Adriana-Maria Matei & Beata Vaida) (f)
- May 31 – June 3: One Star #11 in (Turkey) Alanya
  - Winners: Russia (Maksim Hudyakov & Ruslan Bykanov) (m) / Germany (Sarah Schneider & Viktoria Seeber) (f)
- June 14–17: One Star #12 in Baden bei Wien
  - Note: This event was supposed to be held in Monaco, but it was cancelled.
  - Winners: Austria (Clemens Doppler & Alexander Horst) (m) / Germany (Teresa Mersmann & Cinja Tillmann) (f)
- June 20–23: One Star #13 in (Turkey) Manavgat
  - Winners: Brazil (Oscar Brandão & Luciano Ferreira de Paula) (m) / Japan (Satono Ishitsubo & Asami Shiba) (f)
- July 5–8: One Star #14 in (Croatia) Poreč
  - Winners: Ukraine (Sergiy Popov & Vladyslav Iemelianchyk) (m) / United States (Torrey Van Winden & Emily Sonny) (f)
- July 5–8: One Star #15 in Anapa
  - Winners: China (HA Likejiang & WU Jiaxin) (m) / Russia (Nadezda Makroguzova & Svetlana Kholomina) (f)
- July 12–15: One Star #16 in (South Korea) Daegu (women only)
  - Winners: Australia (Phoebe Bell & Jessyka Ngauamo)
- July 19–22: One Star #17 in (South Korea) Ulsan (women only)
  - Winners: Chinese Taipei (Kou Nai-han & LIU Pi Hsin)
- July 26–29: One Star #18 in (Turkey) Samsun
  - Winners: Czech Republic (Jindrich Weiss & Donovan Džavoronok) (m) / Italy (Carolina Ferraris & Francesca Michieletto) (f)
- August 3–5: One Star #19 in (Slovenia) Ljubljana #1
  - Winners: Russia (Valeriy Samoday & Taras Myskiv) (m) / Switzerland (Esmée Böbner & Zoé Vergé-Dépré) (f)
- August 8–12: One Star #20 in (Liechtenstein) Vaduz
  - Winners: Russia (Valeriy Samoday & Taras Myskiv) (m) / United States (Alexandra Wheeler & Lara Dykstra) (f)
- August 23–26: One Star #21 in (Hungary) Siófok
  - Winners: France (Romain di Giantommaso & Jérémy Silvestre) (m) / Slovenia (Tjasa Kotnik & Tjasa Jancar) (f)
- August 28 – September 1: One Star #22 in Montpellier
  - Winners: France (Edouard Rowlandson & Olivier Barthelemy) (m) / France (Alexandra Jupiter & Lézana Placette) (f)
- October 3–5: One Star #23 in Bandar Torkaman (men only)
  - Winners: Iran (Bahman Salemiinjehboroun & Arash Vakili)
- October 9–12: One Star #24 in Babolsar (men only)
  - Winners: Iran (Rahman Raoufi & Abolhamed Mirzaali)
- October 16–19: One Star #25 in (Iran) Bandar-e Anzali (men only)
  - Winners: Kazakhstan (Alexey Sidorenko & Alexandr Dyachenko)
- November 29 – December 2: One Star #26 (final) in (Slovenia) Ljubljana #2 (winter edition)
  - Winners: Belarus (Aliaksandr Dziadkou & Pavel Piatrushka) (m) / Greece (Peny Karagkouni & Vassiliki Arvaniti) (f)

== Volleyball ==
=== World & Challenger volleyball championships ===
- June 20 – 24: 2018 FIVB Volleyball Men's Challenger Cup in Matosinhos (debut event)
  - Portugal defeated Czech Republic, 3–1 in matches played, to win the inaugural FIVB Volleyball Men's Challenger Cup title.
  - Estonia took third place.
  - Note: Portugal has qualified to compete at the 2019 FIVB Volleyball Men's Nations League.
- June 20 – 24: 2018 FIVB Volleyball Women's Challenger Cup in (Peru) Lima (debut event)
  - Bulgaria defeated Colombia, 3–1 in matches played, to win the inaugural FIVB Volleyball Women's Challenger Cup title.
  - Puerto Rico took third place.
  - Note: Bulgaria has qualified to compete at the 2019 FIVB Volleyball Women's Nations League.
- September 9 – 30: 2018 FIVB Volleyball Men's World Championship in both Bulgaria and Italy
  - Poland defeated Brazil, 3–0 in matches played, to win their second consecutive and third overall FIVB Volleyball Men's World Championship title.
  - United States took third place.
- September 29 – October 20: 2018 FIVB Volleyball Women's World Championship in Japan
  - Serbia defeated Italy, 3–2 in matches played, to win their first FIVB Volleyball Women's World Championship title.
  - China took third place.

=== FIVB Nations League ===
- Note: The Nations League replaced both the World League for Men and the World Grand Prix for Women.
- May 15 – July 1: 2018 FIVB Volleyball Women's Nations League (final top six teams to Nanjing)
  - United States defeated Turkey, 3–2 in matches played, to win the inaugural FIVB Volleyball Women's Nations League title.
  - China took third place.
- May 25 – July 8: 2018 FIVB Volleyball Men's Nations League (final top six teams to Lille)
  - Russia defeated France, 3–0 in matches played, to win the inaugural FIVB Volleyball Men's Nations League title.
  - United States took third place.

=== AVC ===
National teams events

- May 20 – 27: 2018 Asian Girls' U17 Volleyball Championship in Nakhon Pathom
  - Japan defeated China, 3–1 in matches played, to win their seventh consecutive and eighth overall Asian Girls' U17 Volleyball Championship title.
  - Thailand took third place.
  - Note: All the teams mentioned above, plus South Korea, have qualified to compete at the 2019 FIVB Volleyball Girls' U18 World Championship.
- June 10 – 17: 2018 Asian Women's U19 Volleyball Championship in (Vietnam) Bắc Ninh
  - Japan defeated China, 3–0 in matches played, to win their sixth Asian Women's U19 Volleyball Championship title.
  - Thailand took third place.
- June 29 – July 6: 2018 Asian Boys' U18 Volleyball Championship in Tabriz
  - Japan defeated South Korea, 3–1 in matches played, to win their second consecutive Asian Boys' U18 Volleyball Championship title.
  - Iran took third place.
  - Note: All teams mentioned above, plus Chinese Taipei, have qualified to compete at the 2019 FIVB Volleyball Boys' U19 World Championship.
- July 21 – 28: 2018 Asian Men's U20 Volleyball Championship in (Bahrain) Manama
  - Iran defeated South Korea, 3–0 in matches played, to win their sixth Asian Men's U20 Volleyball Championship title.
  - Thailand took third place.
  - Note: Iran and South Korea both qualified to compete at the 2019 FIVB Volleyball Men's U21 World Championship.
- August 8 – 15: 2018 Asian Men's Volleyball Cup in (Chinese Taipei) Taipei
  - Qatar defeated Iran, 3–2 in matches played, to win their first Asian Men's Volleyball Cup title.
  - Japan took third place.
- September 15 – 22: 2018 Asian Men's Volleyball Challenge Cup in Colombo (debut event)
  - Iraq defeated Saudi Arabia, 3–2 in matches played, to win the inaugural Asian Men's Volleyball Challenge Cup title.
  - Sri Lanka took third place.
  - Note: Iraq was promoted to compete at the 2020 Asian Men's Volleyball Cup.
- September 16 – 23: 2018 Asian Women's Volleyball Cup in Nakhon Ratchasima
  - China defeated Japan, 3–0 in matches played, to win their third consecutive and fifth overall Asian Women's Volleyball Cup title.
  - Thailand took third place.
- December 3 – 9: 2018 Asian Women's Volleyball Challenge Cup in Hong Kong (debut event)

Clubs teams events

- July 11 – 18: 2018 Asian Women's Club Volleyball Championship in (Kazakhstan) Ust-Kamenogorsk
  - (Thailand) Supreme Chonburi defeated (Japan) NEC Red Rockets, 3–2 in matches played, to win their second consecutive Asian Women's Club Volleyball Championship title.
  - (China) Jiangsu Zenith Steel took third place.
  - Note: Supreme Chonburi has qualified to compete at the 2019 FIVB Volleyball Women's Club World Championship.
- July 30 – August 6: 2018 Asian Men's Club Volleyball Championship in (Myanmar) Naypyidaw
  - (Iran) Khatam Ardakan defeated (Kazakhstan) Atyrau, 3–0 in matches played, to win their first Asian Men's Club Volleyball Championship title.
  - (Pakistan) Wapda took third place.

=== NORCECA ===
- March 31 – April 7: 2018 CAZOVA Men's U21 Volleyball Championship in (Suriname) Paramaribo
  - Champions: Barbados; Second: Haiti; Third: Martinique
- May 15 – 21: 2018 NORCECA Women's Challenge Cup (Continental Qualification Tournament) in Edmonton
  - Puerto Rico defeated Canada, 3–2 in matches played, in the final. Cuba took third place.
- June 3 – 10: 2018 NORCECA Men's Challenge Cup (Continental Qualification Tournament) in Pinar del Río
  - Champions: Cuba; Second: Puerto Rico; Third: Guatemala
  - Note: Cuba booked their place in the World Final.
- June 4 – 11: 2018 Boys' Youth NORCECA Volleyball Championship in (Costa Rica) San José
  - Champions: Cuba; Second: United States; Third: Puerto Rico
- June 16 – 24: 2018 Women's Junior NORCECA Volleyball Championship in Aguascalientes City
  - United States defeated Dominican Republic, 3–0 in matches played, to win their seventh Women's Junior NORCECA Volleyball Championship title.
  - Mexico took third place.
- June 21 – 25: 2018 CAZOVA Women's U23 Volleyball Championship in (Caribbean Netherlands) Kralendijk, Bonaire
  - Champions: Suriname; Second: Curaçao; Third: U.S. Virgin Islands
- June 28 – July 5: 2018 Women's CAZOVA Volleyball Championship in Paramaribo
  - Champions: Trinidad and Tobago; Second: Suriname; Third: Barbados; Fourth: Bahamas
- July 6 – 9: 2018 ECVA Women's U20 Volleyball Championship in (Netherlands) Oranjestad, Sint Eustatius
  - Champions: Antigua and Barbuda; Second: Saint Lucia; Third: (Caribbean Netherlands) Sint Eustatius; Fourth: British Virgin Islands
- August 2 – 11: 2018 AFECAVOL Central American Women Senior Championship in Belize City
  - Champions: Costa Rica; Second: Belize; Third: El Salvador
- August 4 – 11: 2018 Men's CAZOVA Volleyball Championship in Paramaribo
  - Champions: Suriname; Second: Bahamas; Third: Trinidad and Tobago
- August 15 – 20: 2018 Women's ECVA Volleyball Championships in St. John's
  - Saint Lucia defeated (France) French Saint Martin, 3–1 in matches played, in the final.
  - Antigua and Barbuda took third place.
- August 25 – September 2: 2018 Men's Junior NORCECA Volleyball Championship in Havana
  - Cuba defeated Dominican Republic, 3–0 in matches played, to win their sixth Men's Junior NORCECA Volleyball Championship title.
  - Canada took third place.
  - Note: Cuba has qualified to compete at the 2019 FIVB Volleyball Men's U21 World Championship.
- August 25 – September 2: 2018 Girls' Youth NORCECA Volleyball Championship in (Honduras) Tegucigalpa
  - United States defeated Canada, 3–0 in matches played, to win their eighth Girls' Youth NORCECA Volleyball Championship title.
  - Cuba took third place.
  - Note: Both the United States and Canada have qualified to compete at the 2019 FIVB Volleyball Girls' U18 World Championship.
- September 4 – 10: 2018 Women's Junior NORCECA Final Four Volleyball Championship in Lima
  - Dominican Republic defeated Argentina, 3–1 in matches played, in the final.
  - Cuba won the bronze medal, but Peru took third place.
- September 14 – 23: 2018 Men's U23 AFECAVOL Central American Volleyball Championship in Guatemala City
  - Champions: Guatemala; Second: Nicaragua; Third: Panama
- November 1 – 4: 2018 Men's ECVA Volleyball Championship in (Grenada) La Borie
  - Saint Vincent and the Grenadines defeated Antigua and Barbuda, 3–2 in matches played, in the final.
  - Saint Lucia took third place.
- November 8 – 17: 2018 Men's Central American Volleyball Championship in San Salvador
  - Champions: Guatemala; Second: Costa Rica; Third: El Salvador

=== CSV ===
Clubs teams events

- February 18 – 25: 2018 Women's South American Volleyball Club Championship in (Brazil) Belo Horizonte
  - (Brazil) Camponesa/Minas defeated fellow Brazilian team, Sesc RJ Vôlei, 3–2 in a tie break, to win their third Women's South American Volleyball Club Championship title.
  - (Peru) Club de Regatas Lima took third place.
- February 25 – March 4: 2018 Men's South American Volleyball Club Championship in (Brazil) Montes Claros
  - (Brazil) Sada Cruzeiro defeated (Argentina) Lomas Vóley, 3–0 in matches played, to win their second consecutive and fifth overall Men's South American Volleyball Club Championship title.
  - (Brazil) Montes Claros Vôlei took third place.

National teams events

- May 16 – 21: 2018 Men's South American Volleyball Challenger Cup in Santiago
  - Champions: Chile; Second: Peru; Third: Paraguay; Fourth: Bolivia
- May 23 – 28: 2018 Women's South American Volleyball Challenger Cup in Lima
  - Champions: Peru; Second: Colombia; Third: Chile; Fourth: Venezuela
- June 6 – 13: 2018 Girls' Youth South American Volleyball Championship in (Colombia) Valledupar
  - Argentina defeated Peru, 3–1 in matches played, to win their second Girls' Youth South American Volleyball Championship title.
  - Brazil took third place.
  - Note: All teams mentioned above have qualified to compete at the 2019 FIVB Volleyball Girls' U18 World Championship.
- September 22 – 29: 2018 Boys' Youth South American Volleyball Championship in Sopó
  - Brazil defeated Argentina, 3–0 in matches played, to win their 17th Boys' Youth South American Volleyball Championship title.
  - Colombia took third place.
  - Note: All three teams mentioned here have qualified to compete at the 2019 FIVB Volleyball Boys' U19 World Championship.
- October 15 – 22: 2018 Women's Junior South American Volleyball Championship in Lima
  - Brazil defeated Argentina, 3–2 in matches played, to win their 15th consecutive and 20th overall Women's Junior South American Volleyball Championship title.
  - Peru took third place.
- October 22 – 27: 2018 Men's Junior South American Volleyball Championship in Bariloche
  - Brazil defeated Argentina, 3–1 in matches played, to win their 19th Men's Junior South American Volleyball Championship title.
  - Chile took third place.

=== 2018 Pan American Volleyball Cups ===
- July 8 – 14: 2018 Women's Pan-American Volleyball Cup in Santo Domingo
  - United States defeated Dominican Republic, 3–2 in matches played, to win their second consecutive and sixth overall Women's Pan-American Volleyball Cup title.
  - Canada took third place.
  - Note: All teams mentioned above, with Brazil, Colombia, & Peru, all qualified to compete at the 2019 Pan American Games.
- August 12 – 20: 2018 Women's U23 Pan-American Volleyball Cup in Peru
  - Dominican Republic defeated Peru, 3–0 in matches played, to win their fourth consecutive Women's U23 Pan-American Volleyball Cup title.
  - Cuba took third place.
- August 26 – September 2: 2018 Men's Pan-American Volleyball Cup in Córdoba, Veracruz
  - Argentina defeated Brazil, 3–2 in matches played, to win their second consecutive Men's Pan-American Volleyball Cup title.
  - Cuba took third place.
  - Note: All three teams above, with Puerto Rico and Mexico, have qualified to compete at the 2019 Pan American Games.
- September 4 – 10: 2018 Women's U20 Final Four Volleyball Cup in Lima
  - Dominican Republic defeated Argentina, 3–1 in matches played, in the final.
  - Cuba took third place, but Peru won that position, due to that Cuba was not at the tournament for positions.
- October 13 – 21: 2018 Men's U23 Pan-American Volleyball Cup in Guatemala City
  - Cuba defeated Mexico, 3–0 in matches played to win their second Men's U23 Pan-American Volleyball Cup title.
  - Guatemala took third place.

=== CEV ===
Clubs teams events

- November 21, 2017 – April 10, 2018: 2017–18 Men's CEV Cup
  - (Russia) Belogorie Belgorod defeated (Turkey) Ziraat Bankası Ankara, 3–2 in matches played, to win their second Men's CEV Cup title.
- December 5, 2017 – April 11, 2018: 2017–18 CEV Challenge Cup
  - (Italy) Bunge Ravenna defeated (Greece) Olympiacos CFP, 6–2 in matches played in a 2-legged format, to win their second CEV Challenge Cup title.
- December 5, 2017 – May 13, 2018: 2017–18 CEV Champions League
  - (Russia) VC Zenit-Kazan defeated (Italy) Lube Cucine Civitanova, 3–2 in matches played, to win their fourth consecutive and sixth overall CEV Champions League title.
  - (Italy) Sir Colussi Sicoma Perugia took third place.
- December 12, 2017 – April 10, 2018: 2017–18 Women's CEV Cup
  - (Turkey) Eczacıbaşı VitrA Istanbul defeated (Belarus) Minchanka Minsk, 6–1 in matches played in a 2-legged format, to win their second Women's CEV Cup title.
- December 12, 2017 – April 11, 2018: 2017–18 CEV Women's Challenge Cup
  - (Greece) Olympiacos Piraeus defeated (Turkey) Bursa BBSK, 5–4 in matches played in a 2-legged format, to win their first CEV Women's Challenge Cup title.
- December 12, 2017 – May 6, 2018: 2017–18 CEV Women's Champions League
  - (Turkey) VakıfBank Istanbul defeated (Romania) CSM Volei Alba Blaj, 3–0 in matches played, to win their second consecutive and fourth overall CEV Women's Champions League title.
  - (Italy) Imoco Volley Conegliano took third place.

National teams events

- April 7 – 15: 2018 Boys' U18 Volleyball European Championship in Zlín & (Slovakia) Púchov
  - Germany defeated Czech Republic, 3–0 in matches played, to win their first Boys' U18 Volleyball European Championship title.
  - Italy took third place.
  - Note: All teams mentioned above, along with Russia, Belarus, and Bulgaria, have qualified to compete at the 2019 FIVB Volleyball Boys' U19 World Championship.
- April 13 – 21: 2018 Girls' U17 Volleyball European Championship in Sofia
  - Russia defeated Italy, 3–1 in matches played, to win their third consecutive and fourth overall Girls' U17 Volleyball European Championship title.
  - Turkey took third place.
  - Note: All teams mentioned above, along with Bulgaria, Romania, and Belarus, have qualified to compete at the 2019 FIVB Volleyball Girls' U18 World Championship.
- May 19 – June 16: 2018 Men's European Volleyball League
  - Estonia defeated Czech Republic, 3–0 in matches played, to win their second Men's European Volleyball League title.
  - Turkey took third place.
  - Note: Both Estonia and the Czech Republic have qualified to compete at the 2018 FIVB Volleyball Men's Challenger Cup.
- May 19 – June 17: 2018 Women's European Volleyball League
  - Bulgaria defeated Hungary, 3–0 in matches played, to win their first Women's European Volleyball League title.
  - Czech Republic took third place.
  - Note: Both Bulgaria and Hungary have qualified to compete at the 2018 FIVB Volleyball Women's Challenger Cup.
- July 14 – 22: 2018 Men's U20 Volleyball European Championship in Belgium & the Netherlands
  - Russia defeated Czech Republic, 3–2 in matches played, to win their 19th Men's U20 Volleyball European Championship title.
  - Belgium took third place.
- September 1 – 9: 2018 Women's U19 Volleyball European Championship in Albania
  - Italy defeated Russia, 3–2 in matches played, to win their seventh Women's U19 Volleyball European Championship title.
  - Poland took third place.
  - Note: Italy and Russia have qualified to compete at the 2019 FIVB Volleyball Women's U20 World Championship.

=== CAVB ===
- March 4 – 16: 2018 Women's African Volleyball Clubs Championship in Egypt
  - (Egypt) Al Ahly defeated (Tunisia) CF de Carthage, 3–0 in matches played, to win their ninth Women's African Volleyball Clubs Championship title.
  - Kenya Pipelines took third place.
- March 25 – April 6: 2018 African Volleyball Clubs Champions Championship in Egypt
  - (Egypt) Al Ahly defeated fellow Egyptian team, Tala'ea El-Gaish SC, 3–0 in matches played, to win their second consecutive and 13th overall African Volleyball Clubs Champions Championship title.
  - (Egypt) Smouha SC took third place.
