= 2012 Boys' Youth NORCECA Volleyball Championship =

2012 Boys' Youth NORCECA Championship
Tournament details
- Host country: Mexico
- Dates: July 2 – 7
- Teams: 8
- Venue: 1 (in Tijuana host cities)

Final positions
- Champions: Cuba (3rd title)
- Runners-up: Mexico
- Third place: United States

Tournament awards
- MVP: Osmany Uriarte (CUB)

The 2012 Boys' Youth NORCECA Volleyball Championship was the eighth edition of the bi-annual Volleyball Tournament, played by eight countries from July 2–7, 2012 in Tijuana, Baja California, Mexico. The top two teams other than Mexico qualified to the 2013 Boys Youth World Championship, Mexico had already secured a berth as Host.

== Teams ==
| Pool A | Pool B |
|---|---|
| Cuba; Costa Rica; Nicaragua; Saint Martin | Mexico; Puerto Rico; United States; U.S. Virgin Islands |

== Pool standing procedure ==
Match won 3–0: 5 points for the winner, 0 point for the loser
Match won 3–1: 4 points for the winner, 1 points for the loser
Match won 3–2: 3 points for the winner, 2 points for the loser
In case of tie, the teams were classified according to the following criteria:
points ratio and sets ratio

== Preliminary round ==
=== Pool A ===
| Pos | Team | Pld | W | L | Pts | SPW | SPL | SPR | SW | SL | SR | Qualification |
|---|---|---|---|---|---|---|---|---|---|---|---|---|
| 1 | Cuba | 3 | 3 | 0 | 15 | 225 | 98 | 2.296 | 9 | 0 | MAX | Semifinals |
| 2 | Nicaragua | 3 | 2 | 1 | 8 | 221 | 220 | 1.005 | 6 | 5 | 1.200 | Quarterfinals |
| 3 | Costa Rica | 3 | 1 | 2 | 7 | 218 | 229 | 0.952 | 5 | 6 | 0.833 | Quarterfinals |
| 4 | Saint Martin | 3 | 0 | 3 | 0 | 108 | 225 | 0.480 | 0 | 9 | 0.000 | |

| Date | Time | | Score | | Set 1 | Set 2 | Set 3 | Set 4 | Set 5 | Total | Report |
|---|---|---|---|---|---|---|---|---|---|---|---|
| 02 Jul | 12:00 | Cuba | 3–0 | Saint Martin | 25–8 | 25–11 | 25–7 | | | 75–26 | P2 P3 |
| 02 Jul | 14:00 | Costa Rica | 2–3 | Nicaragua | 19–25 | 27–25 | 25–22 | 19–25 | 14–16 | 104–113 | P2 P3 |
| 03 Jul | 12:00 | Costa Rica | 3–0 | Saint Martin | 25–9 | 25–16 | 25–16 | | | 75–41 | P2 P3 |
| 03 Jul | 14:00 | Cuba | 3–0 | Nicaragua | 25–14 | 25–11 | 25–8 | | | 75–33 | P2 P3 |
| 04 Jul | 12:00 | Nicaragua | 3–0 | Saint Martin | 25–10 | 25–22 | 25–9 | | | 75–41 | P2 P3 |
| 04 Jul | 14:00 | Cuba | 3–0 | Costa Rica | 25–14 | 25–12 | 25–13 | | | 75–39 | P2 P3 |

=== Pool B ===
| Pos | Team | Pld | W | L | Pts | SPW | SPL | SPR | SW | SL | SR | Qualification |
|---|---|---|---|---|---|---|---|---|---|---|---|---|
| 1 | Mexico | 3 | 3 | 0 | 13 | 262 | 198 | 1.323 | 9 | 2 | 4.500 | Semifinals |
| 2 | United States | 3 | 2 | 1 | 12 | 253 | 214 | 1.182 | 8 | 3 | 2.667 | Quarterfinals |
| 3 | Puerto Rico | 3 | 1 | 2 | 5 | 191 | 205 | 0.932 | 3 | 6 | 0.500 | Quarterfinals |
| 4 | U.S. Virgin Islands | 3 | 0 | 3 | 0 | 136 | 225 | 0.604 | 0 | 9 | 0.000 | |

| Date | Time | | Score | | Set 1 | Set 2 | Set 3 | Set 4 | Set 5 | Total | Report |
|---|---|---|---|---|---|---|---|---|---|---|---|
| 02 Jul | 16:00 | United States | 3–0 | Puerto Rico | 25–23 | 25–23 | 25–18 | | | 75–64 | P2 P3 |
| 02 Jul | 18:00 | Mexico | 3–0 | U.S. Virgin Islands | 25–17 | 25–16 | 25–10 | | | 75–43 | P2 P3 |
| 03 Jul | 16:00 | United States | 3–0 | U.S. Virgin Islands | 25–17 | 25–11 | 25–10 | | | 75–38 | P2 P3 |
| 03 Jul | 18:00 | Mexico | 3–0 | Puerto Rico | 25–15 | 25–20 | 25–17 | | | 75–52 | P2 P3 |
| 04 Jul | 16:00 | Puerto Rico | 3–0 | U.S. Virgin Islands | 25–19 | 25–15 | 25–21 | | | 75–55 | P2 P3 |
| 04 Jul | 18:00 | Mexico | 3–2 | United States | 24–26 | 25–23 | 25–19 | 23–25 | 15–12 | 112–105 | P2 P3 |

== Final round ==
=== Championship bracket ===
Quarterfinals
A2 | Nicaragua | 0
B3 | Puerto Rico | 3
B2 | United States | 3
A3 | Costa Rica | 0

Semifinals
B1 | Mexico | 3
B3 | Puerto Rico | 0
A1 | Cuba | 3
B2 | United States | 1

Finals
A1 | Mexico | 0
B1 | Cuba | 3
Third place
B3 | Puerto Rico | 2
B2 | United States | 3

=== 5th–8th places bracket ===
Classification 5/8
Saint Martin | 0
Nicaragua | 3
U.S. Virgin Islands | 0
Costa Rica | 3

5th Place Match
Nicaragua | 3
Costa Rica | 2
7th Place Match
Saint Martin | 1
U.S. Virgin Islands | 3

=== Quarterfinals ===
| Date | Time | | Score | | Set 1 | Set 2 | Set 3 | Set 4 | Set 5 | Total | Report |
|---|---|---|---|---|---|---|---|---|---|---|---|
| 05 Jul | 17:00 | United States | 3–0 | Costa Rica | 25–13 | 25–13 | 25–16 | | | 75–42 | P2 P3 |
| 05 Jul | 19:00 | Nicaragua | 0–3 | Puerto Rico | 15–25 | 21–25 | 14–25 | | | 50–75 | P2 P3 |

=== 5th–8th classification matches ===
| Date | Time | | Score | | Set 1 | Set 2 | Set 3 | Set 4 | Set 5 | Total | Report |
|---|---|---|---|---|---|---|---|---|---|---|---|
| 06 Jul | 12:00 | Saint Martin | 0–3 | Nicaragua | 10–25 | 19–25 | 14–25 | | | 43–75 | P2 P3 |
| 06 Jul | 14:00 | U.S. Virgin Islands | 0–3 | Costa Rica | 17–25 | 20–25 | 24–26 | | | 61–76 | P2 P3 |

=== Semifinals ===
| Date | Time | | Score | | Set 1 | Set 2 | Set 3 | Set 4 | Set 5 | Total | Report |
|---|---|---|---|---|---|---|---|---|---|---|---|
| 06 Jul | 17:00 | Cuba | 3–1 | United States | 22–25 | 25–16 | 26–24 | 25–19 | | 98–84 | P2 P3 |
| 06 Jul | 19:00 | Mexico | 3–0 | Puerto Rico | 25–11 | 25–14 | 25–16 | | | 75–41 | P2 P3 |

=== 7th place match ===
| Date | Time | | Score | | Set 1 | Set 2 | Set 3 | Set 4 | Set 5 | Total | Report |
|---|---|---|---|---|---|---|---|---|---|---|---|
| 07 Jul | 12:00 | Saint Martin | 1–3 | U.S. Virgin Islands | 25–19 | 22–25 | 22–25 | 21–25 | | 90–94 | P2 P3 |

=== 5th place match ===
| Date | Time | | Score | | Set 1 | Set 2 | Set 3 | Set 4 | Set 5 | Total | Report |
|---|---|---|---|---|---|---|---|---|---|---|---|
| 07 Jul | 14:00 | Nicaragua | 3–2 | Costa Rica | 18–25 | 21–25 | 25–23 | 25–23 | 15–12 | 104–108 | P2 P3 |

=== 3rd place match ===
| Date | Time | | Score | | Set 1 | Set 2 | Set 3 | Set 4 | Set 5 | Total | Report |
|---|---|---|---|---|---|---|---|---|---|---|---|
| 07 Jul | 17:00 | Puerto Rico | 2–3 | United States | 25–22 | 19–25 | 11–25 | 28–26 | 7–15 | 90–113 | P2 P3 |

=== Final ===
| Date | Time | | Score | | Set 1 | Set 2 | Set 3 | Set 4 | Set 5 | Total | Report |
|---|---|---|---|---|---|---|---|---|---|---|---|
| 07 Jul | 19:00 | Mexico | 0–3 | Cuba | 15–25 | 21–25 | 14–25 | | | 50–75 | P2 P3 |

== Final standing ==
| Rank | Team |
|---|---|
| 1st place, gold medalist(s) | Cuba |
| 2nd place, silver medalist(s) | Mexico |
| 3rd place, bronze medalist(s) | United States |
| 4 | Puerto Rico |
| 5 | Nicaragua |
| 6 | Costa Rica |
| 7 | U.S. Virgin Islands |
| 8 | Saint Martin |

| Qualified for the 2013 World Youth Championship |

2012 Boys' Youth NORCECA champions

Cuba
3rd title

== Awards ==
- MVP: (Cuba) Osmany Uriarte
- Best scorer: (Cuba) Osmany Uriarte
- Best spiker: (Cuba) Inover Romero
- Best blocker: (Cuba) Jorge Caraballo
- Best server: (Cuba) Osmany Uriarte
- Best digger: (Costa Rica) Luis Chavez
- Best setter: (Cuba) Ricardo Calvo
- Best receiver: (Cuba) Entenza Barbaro
- Best libero: (Costa Rica) Luis Chavez
