= United States men's national under-19 volleyball team =

United States U19
- Association: USA Volleyball
- Confederation: NORCECA

Uniforms
Home	Away	Third

Youth Olympic Games
- Appearances: None

FIVB U19 World Championship
- Appearances: 10 (First in 1995)
- Best result: Fourth place : (2023)

Boys U19 NORCECA Continental Championship
- Appearances: 11 (First in 1998)
- Best result: (gold) Gold : (2008, 2014, 2024)
- www.usavolleyball.org
Honours
Boys U19 NORCECA Continental Championship
Gold medal – first place	2008 United States	Team
Gold medal – first place	2014 United States	Team
Gold medal – first place	2024 Puerto Rico	Team
Silver medal – second place	2002 Dominican Republic	Team
Silver medal – second place	2006 Dominican Republic	Team
Silver medal – second place	2010 Mexico	Team
Silver medal – second place	2016 Cuba	Team
Silver medal – second place	2018 Costa Rica	Team
Silver medal – second place	2026 Canada	Team
Bronze medal – third place	2012 Mexico	Team
Boys U19 NORCECA Pan American Cup
Gold medal – first place	2022 Guatemala	Team
Gold medal – first place	2023 Guatemala	Team
Gold medal – first place	2025 Mexico	Team
Bronze medal – third place	2011 Mexico	Team

The United States men's national under-19 volleyball team represents the United States in international men's volleyball competitions and friendly matches under the age 19 and it is ruled by the USA Volleyball USAV body That is an affiliate of the International Volleyball Federation FIVB and also a part of the North, Central America and Caribbean Volleyball Confederation NORCECA.

== Results ==
=== Summer Youth Olympics ===
Champions Runners up Third place Fourth place

Youth Olympic Games
Year	Round	Position	Pld	W	L	SW	SL	Squad
(Singapore) 2010	Didn't Qualify							
(China) 2014	No Volleyball Event							
(Argentina) 2018	No Volleyball Event							
Total	0 Title	0/1	—N/a					

=== FIVB U19 World Championship ===
Champions Runners up Third place Fourth place

FIVB U19 World Championship
Year	Round	Position	Pld	W	L	SW	SL	Squad
(United Arab Emirates) 1989	Didn't Qualify							
(Portugal) 1991	Didn't Qualify							
(Turkey) 1993	Didn't Qualify							
(Puerto Rico) 1995	—N/a	7th place	—N/a					Squad
(Iran) 1997	Didn't Qualify							
(Saudi Arabia) 1999	Didn't Qualify							
(Egypt) 2001	Didn't Qualify							
(Thailand) 2003	Didn't Qualify							
(Algeria) 2005	Didn't Qualify							
(Mexico) 2007	First round	15th place	8	3	5	17	15	Squad
(Italy) 2009	First round	10th place	8	5	3	17	13	Squad
(Argentina) 2011	First round	11th place	8	3	5	14	20	Squad
(Mexico) 2013	Round of 16	16th place	8	2	6	11	21	Squad
(Argentina) 2015	Quarterfinals	7th place	8	6	2	20	11	Squad
(Bahrain) 2017	Round of 16	15th place	8	4	4	15	16	Squad
(Tunisia) 2019	Round of 16	15th place	8	3	5	13	15	Squad
(Iran) 2021	Withdrew							
(Argentina) 2023	Semifinals	Fourth place	8	5	3	17	9	Squad
(Uzbekistan) 2025	Round of 16	15th place	9	4	5	18	21	Squad
Total	0 Title	10/19	—N/a					

=== Boys U19 NORCECA Continental Championship ===
Champions Runners up Third place Fourth place

Boys U19 NORCECA Continental Championship
Year	Round	Position	Pld	W	L	SW	SL	Squad
(Dominican Republic) 1998	Semi-Final	Fourth place	5	1	4	6	14	Squad
(Mexico) 2000	Didn't Participated							
(Dominican Republic) 2002	Final	Silver	3	2	1	6	4	Squad
(Mexico) 2004	Didn't Participated							
(Dominican Republic) 2006	Final	Silver	6	5	1	15	5	Squad
(United States) 2008	Final	Gold	4	4	0	12	0	Squad
(Mexico) 2010	Final	Silver	5	3	2	9	6	Squad
(Mexico) 2012	Semi-Final	Bronze	6	4	2	15	8	Squad
(United States) 2014	Final	Gold	4	4	0	12	0	Squad
(Cuba) 2016	Final	Silver	5	4	1	14	5	Squad
(Costa Rica) 2018	Final	Silver	6	4	2	12	6	Squad
(Puerto Rico) 2024	Final	Gold	5	5	0	15	1	Squad
(Canada) 2026	Final	Silver	5	4	1	14	3	Squad
Total	3 Titles	11/13	54	40	14	130	52	—N/a

=== Boys U19 NORCECA Pan American Cup ===
Champions Runners up Third place Fourth place

Boys U19 NORCECA Pan American Cup
Year	Round	Position	Pld	W	L	SW	SL	Squad
(Mexico) 2011	Semifinals	Third place	5	3	2	11	6	Squad
(Mexico) 2017	Didn't Participated							
(Dominican Republic) 2019	Didn't Participated							
(Guatemala) 2022	Final	Champion	5	5	0	15	0	Squad
(Guatemala) 2023	Final	Champion	5	5	0	15	1	Squad
(Mexico) 2025	Final	Champion	5	5	0	15	0	Squad
Total	3 Titles	4/6	20	18	2	56	7	—N/a

== Team ==
=== Current squad ===
Captain
Libero

The following is the American roster in the 2026 Boys U19 NORCECA Continental Championship.

Head Coach: Andy Read

No.	Name	Date of birth	Height	Weight	Spike	Block	School
1	Wade Coppedge		1.86 m (6 ft 1 in)				(United States) Grace Christian School
2	Trayce Chrusfield III		1.88 m (6 ft 2 in)				(United States) Oak Park River Forest HS
3	Collin Tullis		1.86 m (6 ft 1 in)				(United States) Seton Home Study
5	Franklin Shiekh		1.92 m (6 ft 4 in)				(United States) St John Bosco HS
7	Nils Bennebroek		1.98 m (6 ft 6 in)				(United States) Hillsdale HS
8	Chase Wallin		1.98 m (6 ft 6 in)				(United States) Santa Margarita Catholic HS
11	Jackson Feik		2.00 m (6 ft 7 in)				(United States) Regis Jesuit HS
12	Carter Tchaikovsky		1.96 m (6 ft 5 in)				(United States) Huntington Beach HS
13	Cameron Kosolcharoen		2.00 m (6 ft 7 in)				(United States) San Clemente HS
14	Jason Amani		2.02 m (6 ft 8 in)				(United States) Dubiski Career HS
16	Daniel Hornyak		2.02 m (6 ft 8 in)				(United States) Poway HS
17	Bryce Thistlethwaite		2.02 m (6 ft 8 in)				(United States) Wheeling HS
19	Matthew Kravtsov		2.02 m (6 ft 8 in)				(United States) Barrington Community HS
20	Kevin O’Brien		2.10 m (6 ft 11 in)				(United States) Francis Parker School
