= Morteza Mehrzad =

Iranian sitting volleyball player (born 1987)

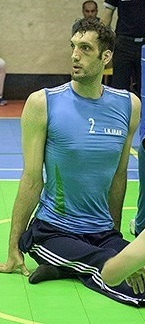
- Morteza Mehrzadselakjani in 2016

Personal information
- Full name: Morteza Mehrzadselakjani
- Born: 17 September 1987 (age 39); Kelachay, Gilan, Iran
- Height: 2.47 m (8 ft 1 in)
- Weight: 140
- Spike: 201
- Block: 195

Volleyball information
- Position: Outside hitter
- Number: 2

Career
Teams
| | Baran Kerman V.C. |

National team
| 2015– | Iran sitting volleyball team |
Honours
Paralympic Games
| Gold medal – first place | 2016 Rio de Janeiro | Sitting volleyball |
| Gold medal – first place | 2020 Tokyo | Sitting volleyball |
| Gold medal – first place | 2024 Paris | Sitting volleyball |
World Para Volleyball Championship
| Gold medal – first place | 2018 World Para Volleyball Championship | 2018 Arnhem |
| Gold medal – first place | 2022 Sitting Volleyball World Championships – Men's event | 2022 Sarajevo |
| Gold medal – first place | 2026 Sitting Volleyball World Championships – Men's event | 2026 Hangzhou |
Asian Para Games
| Gold medal – first place | 2018 Jakarta | Sitting volleyball |
| Gold medal – first place | 2022 Hangzhou | Sitting volleyball |
Sitting Volleyball World Cup
| Gold medal – first place | 2023 Egypt | Sitting volleyball |

Morteza Mehrzadselakjani, often referred to as Morteza Mehrzad (born 17 September 1987), is an Iranian volleyball player who plays on the Iran men's national sitting volleyball team. With a height of 2.47 m, he also holds the record for the longest hand in the world with a size of 29 cm. He is known as the tallest living man in Iran and the third tallest living man in the world. He won three gold medals at the 2016 Summer Paralympics, 2020 Summer Paralympics and 2024 Summer Paralympics, is three-time World Para Volleyball champion, three-time gold medalist at the Asian Games with Iran men's national sitting volleyball team, and three-time winner of the Golden Ball award for the best player (won in 2019, 2021 and 2022).

He has acromegaly, and has won the gold medal at the 2016 Summer Paralympics in Rio de Janeiro, 2018 Asian Para Games in Jakarta, 2018 Sitting Volleyball World Championship and 2020 Summer Paralympics In Tokyo and 2022 Sitting Volleyball World Championship in Sarajevo with Iran men's national sitting volleyball team.

== Biography ==
Morteza Mehrzad had a severe medical condition called gigantism which is triggered by excessive growth hormone production in the brain's pituitary gland. He was measured to be over 6 feet 2 inches at the age of 16. When he was 15 he had a bicycle accident which caused a serious pelvic fracture. The accident stopped his right leg from growing, leaving it about 15 centimeters shorter than his left leg. He started to feel depressed after the accident and began using a wheelchair, crutches and a walking stick following the accident.

== Career ==
His talent was spotted and identified by Iran national head coach Hadi Rezaei in 2011 after watching a television program which talked about unusual and disabled talented people. Hadi quickly got in touch with the television network to inquire about Mehrzad who was also one of the disabled talents to have participated in the program. Hadi convinced and encouraged Mehrzad to play sitting volleyball.

He was selected for Iran's national team in March 2016 after undergoing training sessions at various regional clubs in Iran and made his international debut in 2016 at the Paralympics qualifiers. Subsequently, he was also selected for the national team to compete at the 2016 Summer Paralympics, which marked his Paralympic debut.

In the 2016 Summer Paralympics sitting volleyball final, he was the match top scorer with 28 points for Iran. Iran eventually secured a gold medal after defeating Bosnia and Herzegovina 3–1 in the final. He was also the second best spiker during the 2016 Rio Paralympics.

In 2018, he helped Iran win the 2018 Sitting Volleyball World Championship, securing Iran's first world title in 8 years, after a 3–0 victory over defending champions Bosnia and Herzegovina in the final.

In the 2020 Summer Paralympics sitting volleyball tournament, Mehrzad won his second gold medal at the Paralympic Games after Iran defeated Bosnia and Herzegovina 3–0 in the semi-final and Russia 3–1 in the final.

In 2022, he won his second Sitting Volleyball World Championship with Iran's national team in the 2022 Sitting Volleyball World Championship, after a 3–0 victory over Bosnia and Herzegovina in the final.

In the 2024 Summer Paralympics sitting volleyball tournament, Mehrzad won his third gold medal at the Paralympic Games with Iran's national sitting volleyball team, after defeating Egypt 3–1 in the semi-final and Bosnia and Herzegovina 3–1 in the final. He was Iran's top scorer in the gold medal match, scoring 25 points.

== See also ==
- Sitting volleyball at the 2016 Summer Paralympics
- List of tallest people
- List of humans with gigantism
