= 2017 Boys' Youth Pan-American Volleyball Cup =

Tournament details
- Host country: Mexico
- Dates: March 20–25, 2017
- Teams: 9

Final positions
- Champions: Mexico (1st title)

Tournament awards
- MVP: Raymond Stephens (MEX)

The 2017 Boys' Youth Pan-American Volleyball Cup was the second edition of the bi-annual Continental Cup, played by nine countries from March 20–25, 2017 in Monterrey, Mexico. Mexico won the tournament beating Chile in the finals. The two former teams along with Puerto Rico have qualified for the U19 World Championship

== Competing nations ==
Group A	Group B	Group C
Chile; Dominican Republic; Peru	Colombia; Jamaica; Puerto Rico	Costa Rica; Mexico; Nicaragua

== Preliminary round ==
- All times are in Central Standard Time (UTC−06:00)

=== Group A ===
Pos	Team	Pld	W	L	Pts	SPW	SPL	SPR	SW	SL	SR	Qualification
1	Chile	2	2	0	8	188	143	1.315	6	2	3.000	Semifinals
2	Dominican Republic	2	1	1	7	173	172	1.006	5	3	1.667	Quarterfinals
3	Peru	2	0	2	0	104	150	0.693	0	6	0.000	

Date	Time		Score		Set 1	Set 2	Set 3	Set 4	Set 5	Total	Report
20 Mar	18:00	Chile	3–0	Peru	25–14	25–13	25–18			75–45	P2 P3
21 Mar	20:00	Dominican Republic	2–3	Chile	21–25	28–26	14–25	25–22	10–15	98–113	P2 P3
22 Mar	16:00	Peru	0–3	Dominican Republic	21–25	21–25	17–25			59–75	P2 P3

=== Group B ===
Pos	Team	Pld	W	L	Pts	SPW	SPL	SPR	SW	SL	SR	Qualification
1	Puerto Rico	2	2	0	8	174	148	1.176	6	2	3.000	Quarterfinals
2	Colombia	2	1	1	7	174	141	1.234	5	3	1.667	Quarterfinals
3	Jamaica	2	0	2	0	91	150	0.607	0	6	0.000	

Date	Time		Score		Set 1	Set 2	Set 3	Set 4	Set 5	Total	Report
20 Mar	16:00	Jamaica	0–3	Puerto Rico	19–25	15–25	15–25			49–75	P2 P3
21 Mar	16:00	Colombia	3–0	Jamaica	25–10	25–20	25–12			75–42	P2 P3
22 Mar	18:00	Puerto Rico	3–2	Colombia	13–25	25–20	21–25	25–20	15–9	99–99	P2 P3

=== Group C ===
Pos	Team	Pld	W	L	Pts	SPW	SPL	SPR	SW	SL	SR	Qualification
1	Mexico	2	2	0	10	150	102	1.471	6	0	MAX	Semifinals
2	Costa Rica	2	1	1	3	158	178	0.888	3	5	0.600	Quarterfinals
3	Nicaragua	2	0	2	2	155	183	0.847	2	6	0.333	

Date	Time		Score		Set 1	Set 2	Set 3	Set 4	Set 5	Total	Report
20 Mar	20:00	Mexico	3–0	Costa Rica	25–20	25–14	25–16			75–50	P2 P3
21 Mar	18:00	Nicaragua	2–3	Costa Rica	25–22	26–28	25–18	17–25	10–15	103–108	P2 P3
22 Mar	20:00	Mexico	3–0	Nicaragua	25–18	25–20	25–14			75–52	P2 P3

== Final round ==
=== Championship bracket ===
Quarterfinals
B2	Colombia	3
A2	Dominican Republic	2
B1	Puerto Rico	3
C2	Costa Rica	0

Semifinals
C1	Mexico	3
B2	Colombia	1
A1	Chile	3
B1	Puerto Rico	0

Finals
C1	Mexico	3
A1	Chile	0
Third place
B2	Colombia	1
B1	Puerto Rico	3

=== Quarterfinals ===
Date	Time		Score		Set 1	Set 2	Set 3	Set 4	Set 5	Total	Report
23 Mar	18:00	Colombia	3–2	Dominican Republic	25–21	25–22	23–25	20–25	15–12	108–105	P2 P3
23 Mar	20:00	Puerto Rico	3–0	Costa Rica	25–14	27–25	25–20			77–59	P2 P3

=== Semifinals ===
Date	Time		Score		Set 1	Set 2	Set 3	Set 4	Set 5	Total	Report
24 Mar	18:00	Chile	3–0	Puerto Rico	25–17	25–21	25–21			75–59	P2 P3
24 Mar	20:00	Mexico	3–1	Colombia	25–20	25–22	29–31	25–19		104–92	P2 P3

=== Ninth place match ===
Date	Time		Score		Set 1	Set 2	Set 3	Set 4	Set 5	Total	Report
23 Mar	16:00	Peru	0–3	Jamaica	17–25	13–25	20–25			50–75	P2 P3

=== Seventh place match ===
Date	Time		Score		Set 1	Set 2	Set 3	Set 4	Set 5	Total	Report
24 Mar	16:00	Nicaragua	3–2	Jamaica	18–25	25–20	16–25	25–21	16–14	100–105	P2 P3

=== Fifth place match ===
Date	Time		Score		Set 1	Set 2	Set 3	Set 4	Set 5	Total	Report
25 Mar	14:00	Dominican Republic	3–0	Costa Rica	25–21	25–22	25–18			75–61	

=== Bronze medal match ===
Date	Time		Score		Set 1	Set 2	Set 3	Set 4	Set 5	Total	Report
25 Mar	16:00	Puerto Rico	3–1	Colombia	16–25	25–18	25–23	27–25		93–91	P2 P3

=== Final ===
Date	Time		Score		Set 1	Set 2	Set 3	Set 4	Set 5	Total	Report
25 Mar	18:00	Chile	0–3	Mexico	20–25	9–25	20–25			49–75	P2 P3

== Final standing ==
Rank	Team
1st place, gold medalist(s)	Mexico
2nd place, silver medalist(s)	Chile
3rd place, bronze medalist(s)	Puerto Rico
4	Colombia
5	Dominican Republic
6	Costa Rica
7	Nicaragua
8	Jamaica
9	Peru

Qualified for FIVB U19 World Championship

2017 Boys' Youth Pan-American Cup champions

Mexico
1st title

Team Roster:

J. Flores, R. Stephens, M. Sarabia, J. Cabrera, L. Hernández, D. González, S. Ramírez, A. Téllez, G. Gardea, B. Estrada, J. Cabrera,

D. González
Head Coach: (Mexico) Gabriela Alarcón

== Individual awards ==
- Most valuable player
  - Raymond Stephens (MEX)
- Best scorer
  - Gabriel García (PUR)
- Best setter
  - Jonathan Cabrera (MEX)
- Best server
  - Raymond Stephens (MEX)
- Best Outside Hitters
  - Shavar James (JAM)
  - Bayron Valdez (DOM)
- Best Middle Blockers
  - Axel Téllez (MEX)
  - Alex Rusch (CHI)
- Best Opposite
  - Gabriel García (PUR)
- Best libero
  - Lucas Lavín (CHI)
- Best receiver
  - Raymond Stephens (MEX)
- Best digger
  - Lucas Lavín (CHI)
