= Micah Maʻa =

American volleyball player (born 1997)

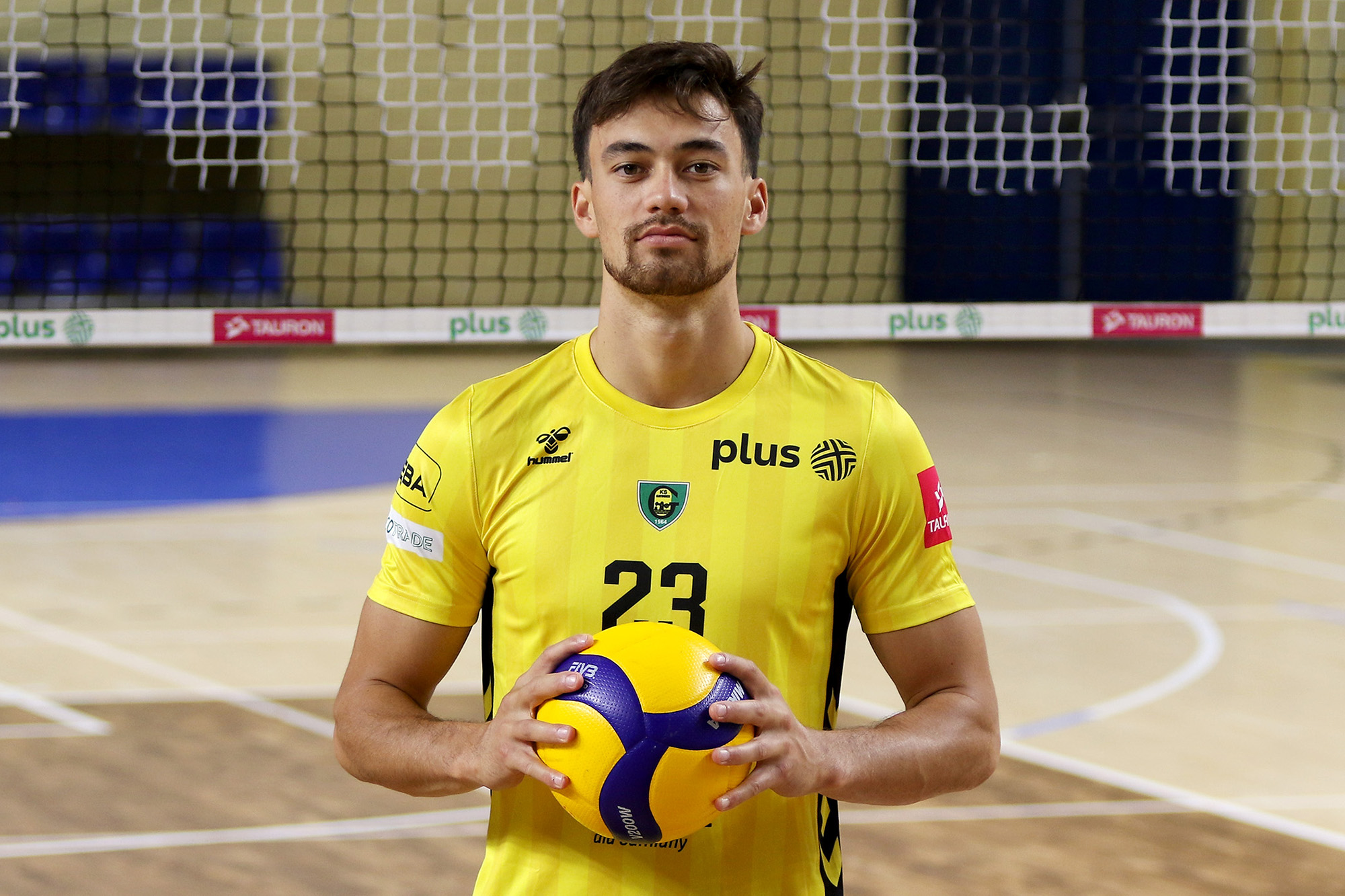
- Maʻa in 2021

Personal information
- Full name: Micah Kupono Maʻa
- Born: April 16, 1997 (age 29); Kaneohe, Hawaii, U.S.
- Height: 6 ft 4 in (1.92 m)
- Weight: 194 lb (88 kg)
- Spike: 131 in (333 cm)
- Block: 125 in (318 cm)
- Education: UCLA

Volleyball information
- Position: Setter
- Current club: Galatasaray

Career
Years	Teams
2015–2019; 2019–2021; 2021–2022; 2022–2025; 2025–2026; 2026–	UCLA Bruins; Stade Poitevin Poitiers; GKS Katowice; Halkbank Ankara; Fakel Novy Urengoy; Galatasaray

National team
United States
Medal record
Men's volleyball
Representing United States
Olympic Games
Bronze medal – third place	2024 Paris	Team
FIVB World Cup
Gold medal – first place	2023 Japan
Bronze medal – third place	2019 Japan
FIVB Nations League
Silver medal – second place	2019 Chicago
Silver medal – second place	2023 Gdańsk
Silver medal – second place	2026 Ningbo
NORCECA Championship
Gold medal – first place	2023 Charleston
Silver medal – second place	2019 Winnipeg

Micah Kupono Maʻa (/ˈmɑːʔɑː/; born April 16, 1997) is an American professional volleyball player who plays as a setter for Galatasaray and the U.S. national team. He won a bronze medal at the 2024 Paris Olympic Games.

== Personal life ==
Maʻa was born in Kāneʻohe, Hawaiʻi to Pono and Lisa Strand-Maʻa.

== Club career ==
Maʻa was a standout 3 sport athlete at Punahou, a state football title in 2013, four state volleyball titles and earning the Hawaiʻi state volleyball player of the year his senior season in 2015 at Punahou. At UCLA he earned AVCA first-team All-America, first team All-MPSF and Off the Block's Server of the Year in his freshman season in 2016, all 2018 NCAA volleyball tournament honors when the Bruins finished runner-up in the championship game against the 49ers of Long Beach State, and AVCA first-team All-America, first-team All-MPSF, setting the UCLA Bruins single-season record of 67 aces his senior season in 2019. He graduated from UCLA in 2019 with a major in political science.

The 2022–23 CEV Champions League was his debut in the top European competition with Halkbank Ankara.

On August 3, 2026, he signed a contract with the Turkish team Galatasaray.

== International career ==
Ma'a was named to the U.S. national team for the 2024 Paris Olympic Games.

== Honors ==
=== College ===
- Domestic
  - 2018 NCAA national championship, with UCLA Bruins

=== Club ===
- Domestic
  - 2019–20 French Cup, with Stade Poitevin Poitiers

=== Youth national team ===
- 2014 NORCECA U19 Championship

=== Individual awards ===
- 2014: NORCECA U19 Championship – Best setter
- 2018: NCAA national championship – All-tournament team
