= 2016 Boys' Youth NORCECA Volleyball Championship =

Tournament details
- Host country: Cuba
- Dates: 24–29 June
- Teams: 8
- Venue(s): Palacio de los Deportes, Ciudad Deportiva (in 1 host city)

Final positions
- Champions: Cuba (4th title)
- Runners-up: United States
- Third place: Mexico

The 2016 Boys' Youth NORCECA Volleyball Championship is the tenth edition of the bi-annual volleyball tournament. It will be held in La Habana, Cuba from 24 June to 29 June. Eight countries will be competing in the tournament.

== Pool composition ==
Group A	Group B
United States	Cuba
Nicaragua	Mexico
Costa Rica	Antigua and Barbuda
Dominican Republic	Jamaica

== Pool standing procedure ==
1. Number of matches won
2. Match points
3. Points ratio
4. Sets ratio
5. Result of the last match between the tied teams

Match won 3–0: 5 match points for the winner, 0 match points for the loser
Match won 3–1: 4 match points for the winner, 1 match point for the loser
Match won 3–2: 3 match points for the winner, 2 match points for the loser

== Preliminary round ==
- All times are in Eastern Daylight Time - (UTC−04:00)

=== Group A ===
Pos	Team	Pld	W	L	Pts	SPW	SPL	SPR	SW	SL	SR	Qualification
1	United States	3	3	0	15	225	154	1.461	9	0	MAX	Semifinals
2	Nicaragua	3	2	1	7	254	266	0.955	6	6	1.000	Quarterfinals
3	Dominican Republic	3	1	2	4	244	276	0.884	4	8	0.500	Quarterfinals
4	Costa Rica	3	0	3	4	257	284	0.905	4	9	0.444	5th–8th classification

Date	Time		Score		Set 1	Set 2	Set 3	Set 4	Set 5	Total	Report
24 June	16:00	United States	3–0	Nicaragua	25–23	25–12	25–23			75–58	P2 P3
24 June	20:00	Costa Rica	2–3	Dominican Republic	25–18	18–25	24–26	26–24	13–15	106–108	P2 P3
25 June	16:00	Dominican Republic	1–3	Nicaragua	25–20	13–25	21–25	23–25		82–95	P2 P3
25 June	20:00	United States	3–0	Costa Rica	25–9	25–17	25–16			75–42	P2 P3
26 June	14:00	Nicaragua	3–2	Costa Rica	28–26	25–20	13–25	20–25	15–13	101–109	P2 P3
26 June	20:00	Dominican Republic	0–3	United States	16–25	17–25	21–25			54–75	P2 P3

=== Group B ===
Pos	Team	Pld	W	L	Pts	SPW	SPL	SPR	SW	SL	SR	Qualification
1	Cuba	3	3	0	14	247	167	1.479	9	1	9.000	Semifinals
2	Mexico	3	2	1	11	234	176	1.330	7	3	2.333	Quarterfinals
3	Jamaica	3	1	2	5	164	197	0.832	3	6	0.500	Quarterfinals
4	Antigua and Barbuda	3	0	3	0	120	225	0.533	0	9	0.000	5th–8th classification

Date	Time		Score		Set 1	Set 2	Set 3	Set 4	Set 5	Total	Report
24 June	14:00	Mexico	3–0	Jamaica	25–13	25–19	25–8			75–40	P2 P3
24 June	18:00	Cuba	3–0	Antigua and Barbuda	25–8	25–7	25–19			75–34	P2 P3
25 June	14:00	Antigua and Barbuda	0–3	Mexico	10–25	19–25	10–25			39–75	P2 P3
25 June	18:00	Cuba	3–0	Jamaica	25–15	25–11	25–23			75–49	P2 P3
26 June	16:00	Jamaica	3–0	Antigua and Barbuda	25–11	25–20	25–16			75–47	P2 P3
26 June	18:00	Cuba	3–1	Mexico	22–25	25–23	25–20	25–16		97–84	P2 P3

== Final round ==
=== Bracket ===
Quarterfinals
B2	Mexico	3
A3	Dominican Republic	0
A2	Nicaragua	3
B3	Jamaica	0

Semifinals
A1	United States	3
B2	Mexico	2
B1	Cuba	3
A2	Nicaragua	0

Finals
A1	United States	2
B1	Cuba	3
Third place
B2	Mexico	3
A2	Nicaragua	0

Consolation semifinals
B3	Jamaica	3
A4	Costa Rica	0
A3	Dominican Republic	3
B4	Antigua and Barbuda	0

7th place
A4	Costa Rica	3
B4	Antigua and Barbuda	0
5th place
B3	Jamaica	3
A3	Dominican Republic	1

=== Quarterfinals ===
Date	Time		Score		Set 1	Set 2	Set 3	Set 4	Set 5	Total	Report
27 Jun	18:00	Nicaragua	3–0	Jamaica	28–26	25–16	28–26			81–68	P2 P3
27 Jun	20:00	Mexico	3–0	Dominican Republic	25–11	25–12	25–19			75–42	P2 P3

=== 5th–8th Classification ===
Date	Time		Score		Set 1	Set 2	Set 3	Set 4	Set 5	Total	Report
28 Jun	14:00	Costa Rica	0–3	Jamaica	17–25	26–28	25–27			68–80	P2 P3
28 Jun	16:00	Antigua and Barbuda	0–3	Dominican Republic	11–25	18–25	16–25			45–75	P2 P3

=== Semifinals ===
Date	Time		Score		Set 1	Set 2	Set 3	Set 4	Set 5	Total	Report
28 Jun	19:00	Cuba	3–0	Nicaragua	25–18	25–18	25–14			75–50	P2 P3
28 Jun	21:00	United States	3–2	Mexico	17–25	25–18	25–23	23–25	17–15	107–106	P2 P3

=== 7th place ===
Date	Time		Score		Set 1	Set 2	Set 3	Set 4	Set 5	Total	Report
29 Jun	14:00	Costa Rica	3–0	Antigua and Barbuda	25–20	25–10	25–10			75–40	P2 P3

=== 5th place ===
Date	Time		Score		Set 1	Set 2	Set 3	Set 4	Set 5	Total	Report
29 Jun	16:00	Jamaica	3–1	Dominican Republic	12–25	25–18	25–20	25–17		87–80	P2 P3

=== 3rd place ===
Date	Time		Score		Set 1	Set 2	Set 3	Set 4	Set 5	Total	Report
29 Jun	18:00	Mexico	3–0	Nicaragua	25–15	25–20	25–14			75–49	P2 P3

=== Final ===
Date	Time		Score		Set 1	Set 2	Set 3	Set 4	Set 5	Total	Report
29 Jun	20:00	Cuba	3–2	United States	22–25	25–21	25–19	23–25	15–11	110–101	P2 P3

== Finals standing ==
Qualified to 2017 FIVB Boys' World Championship.

Rank	Team
1st place, gold medalist(s)	Cuba
2nd place, silver medalist(s)	United States
3rd place, bronze medalist(s)	Mexico
4	Nicaragua
5	Jamaica
6	Dominican Republic
7	Costa Rica
8	Antigua and Barbuda
