= Osmany Uriarte =

Cuban volleyball player (born 1995)

Personal information
- Full name: Osmany Santiago Uriarte Mestre
- Nationality: Cuban
- Born: 4 June 1995 (age 31)
- Height: 1.97 m (6 ft 6 in)
- Weight: 81 kg (179 lb)
- Spike: 352 cm (139 in)
- Block: 348 cm (137 in)

Volleyball information
- Position: Outside hitter
- Number: 14 (national team)

National team
| 2012–2016 | Cuba |

Osmany Santiago Uriarte Mestre (born 4 June 1995) is a Cuban male volleyball player. Uriarte Mestre was part of the Cuba men's national volleyball team at the 2014 FIVB Volleyball Men's World Championship in Poland. He played for Sancti Spíritus.

Uriarte Mestre was one of the six players of the Cuban national volleyball team arrested and charged with aggravated rape in July 2016 in Tampere, Finland. He was found guilty in September 2016 and was sentenced to five years in prison. His sentence was ultimately reduced to four years.

== Clubs ==
- Sancti Spíritus (2014)
- Maliye Milli Piyango (2015)
- Inegol Belediyespor (2018–2019)
- Galatasaray (2020)
- Cizre Belediyespor (2021)
