= 2023 Boys U19 NORCECA Pan American Cup =

Tournament details
- Host country: Guatemala
- Dates: 11–19 March 2023
- Teams: 8
- Venue: (in Guatemala City host cities)

Final positions
- Champions: United States (2nd title)
- Runners-up: Mexico
- Third place: Puerto Rico

Tournament awards
- MVP: Tread Rosenthal (USA)

The 2023 Boys U19 NORCECA Pan American Cup was the fifth edition of the bi-annual men's volleyball tournament. Eight teams participated in this edition held in Guatemala City.

The United States won their second consecutive title, after defeated Mexico 3–0 in the final. Tread Rosenthal of the United States won the Most Valuable Player award.

== Preliminary round ==
=== Group A ===
Pos	Team	Pld	W	L	Pts	SPW	SPL	SPR	SW	SL	SR	Qualification
1	United States	3	3	0	14	248	192	1.292	9	1	9.000	Semifinals
2	Mexico	3	2	1	11	233	199	1.171	7	3	2.333	Quarterfinals
3	Costa Rica	3	1	2	3	230	250	0.920	3	8	0.375	Quarterfinals
4	Belize	3	0	3	2	196	266	0.737	2	9	0.222	

Date	Time		Score		Set 1	Set 2	Set 3	Set 4	Set 5	Total	Report
13 March	14:00	United States	3–0	Belize	25–11	25–21	25–22			75–54	P2 P3
13 March	16:00	Costa Rica	0–3	Mexico	23–25	20–25	16–25			59–75	P2 P3
14 March	16:00	United States	3–1	Mexico	23–25	25–19	25–19	25–20		98–83	P2 P3
14 March	18:00	Costa Rica	3–2	Belize	25–14	21–25	30–32	25–18	15–11	116–100	P2 P3
15 March	14:00	Costa Rica	0–3	United States	18–25	20–25	17–25			55–75	P2 P3
15 March	16:00	Mexico	3–0	Belize	25–13	25–14	25–15			75–42	P2

=== Group B ===
Pos	Team	Pld	W	L	Pts	SPW	SPL	SPR	SW	SL	SR	Qualification
1	Puerto Rico	3	3	0	14	247	193	1.280	9	1	9.000	Semifinals
2	Guatemala	3	2	1	9	224	197	1.137	6	4	1.500	Quarterfinals
3	Nicaragua	3	1	2	7	236	254	0.929	5	6	0.833	Quarterfinals
4	Suriname	3	0	3	0	163	226	0.721	0	9	0.000	

Date	Time		Score		Set 1	Set 2	Set 3	Set 4	Set 5	Total	Report
13 March	18:00	Puerto Rico	3–1	Nicaragua	21–25	25–19	25–16	25–20		96–80	P2 P3
13 March	20:00	Guatemala	3–0	Suriname	25–19	25–8	25–14			75–41	P2 P3
14 March	14:00	Puerto Rico	3–0	Suriname	25–17	26–24	25–19			76–60	P2 P3
14 March	20:00	Guatemala	3–1	Nicaragua	21–25	25–20	25–18	25–18		96–81	P2 P3
15 March	18:00	Suriname	0–3	Nicaragua	22–25	18–25	22–25			62–75	P2 P3
15 March	20:00	Guatemala	0–3	Puerto Rico	19–25	18–25	16–25			53–75	P2 P3

== Final round ==
=== Championship bracket ===
Quarterfinals
A2	Mexico	3
B3	Nicaragua	0
B2	Guatemala	0
A3	Costa Rica	3

Semifinals
A2	Mexico	3
B1	Puerto Rico	0
A1	United States	3
A3	Costa Rica	0

Final
A2	Mexico	0
A1	United States	3
Third place
B1	Puerto Rico	3
A3	Costa Rica	2

=== Quarterfinals ===
Date	Time		Score		Set 1	Set 2	Set 3	Set 4	Set 5	Total	Report
16 March	18:00	Mexico	3–0	Nicaragua	25–13	25–20	25–15			75–48	P2 P3
16 March	20:00	Guatemala	0–3	Costa Rica	21–25	13–25	21–25			55–75	P2

=== Classification 5th–8th ===
Date	Time		Score		Set 1	Set 2	Set 3	Set 4	Set 5	Total	Report
17 March	14:00	Suriname	2–3	Nicaragua	26–28	25–20	18–25	25–19	7–15	101–107	P2 P3
17 March	16:00	Belize	0–3	Guatemala	23–25	16–25	17–25			56–75	P2 P3

=== Semifinals ===
Date	Time		Score		Set 1	Set 2	Set 3	Set 4	Set 5	Total	Report
17 March	18:00	Puerto Rico	0–3	Mexico	22–25	14–25	29–31			65–81	P2 P3
17 March	20:00	United States	3–0	Costa Rica	25–19	25–19	25–15			75–53	P2 P3

=== Seventh place match ===
Date	Time		Score		Set 1	Set 2	Set 3	Set 4	Set 5	Total	Report
18 March	14:00	Suriname	0–3	Belize	19–25	22–25	18–25			59–75	P2 P3

=== Fifth place match ===
Date	Time		Score		Set 1	Set 2	Set 3	Set 4	Set 5	Total	Report
18 March	16:00	Nicaragua	0–3	Guatemala	24–26	21–25	22–25			67–76	P2 P3

=== Bronze medal match ===
Date	Time		Score		Set 1	Set 2	Set 3	Set 4	Set 5	Total	Report
18 March	18:00	Puerto Rico	3–2	Costa Rica	24–26	25–22	18–25	25–22	15–12	107–107	P2 P3

=== Final ===
Date	Time		Score		Set 1	Set 2	Set 3	Set 4	Set 5	Total	Report
18 March	20:00	Mexico	0–3	United States	23–25	22–25	20–25			65–75	P2 P3

== Final standing ==
Rank	Team
1st place, gold medalist(s)	United States
2nd place, silver medalist(s)	Mexico
3rd place, bronze medalist(s)	Puerto Rico
4	Costa Rica
5	Guatemala
6	Nicaragua
7	Belize
8	Suriname

== Individual awards ==
- Most valuable player
  - Tread Rosenthal (USA)
- Best scorer
  - Stanley Grant (CRC)
- Best setter
  - Tread Rosenthal (USA)
- Best Opposite
  - Yulius Brown (CRC)
- Best outside hitters
  - Sean Kelley (USA)
  - Franco Roark (PUR)
- Best middle blockers
  - Angelo Guadamuz (NCA)
  - Joshua Aruya (USA)
- Best libero
  - Osmar Peralta (NCA)
- Best server
  - Adolfo Rivas (GUA)
- Best receiver
  - Kallen Larson (USA)
- Best digger
  - Osmar Peralta (NCA)
