= Cuba men's national under-19 volleyball team =

Cuban national sports team

Cuba U19
- Nickname(s): Powerful
- Association: Cuban Volleyball Federation
- Confederation: NORCECA

Uniforms
Home	Away	Third

Youth Olympic Games
- Appearances: 1 (First in 2010)
- Best result: (gold) Champions : (2010)

FIVB U19 World Championship
- Appearances: 8 (First in 1991)
- Best result: (bronze) Bronze : (2011)

NORCECA U19 Championship
- Appearances: 6 (First in 2004)
- Best result: (gold) Gold : (2004, 2010, 2012, 2016)

The Cuba men's national under-19 volleyball team represents Cuba in international men's volleyball competitions and friendly matches under the age 19 and it is ruled by the Cuban Volleyball Federation body That is an affiliate of the International Volleyball Federation FIVB and also a part of the North, Central America and Caribbean Volleyball Confederation NORCECA.

== Results ==
=== Summer Youth Olympics ===
Champions Runners up Third place Fourth place

Youth Olympic Games
Year	Round	Position	Pld	W	L	SW	SL	Squad
(Singapore) 2010	Final	Champions						Squad
(China) 2014	No Volleyball Event							
(Argentina) 2018	No Volleyball Event							
Total	1 Title	1/1						

=== FIVB U19 World Championship ===
Champions Runners up Third place Fourth place

FIVB U19 World Championship
Year	Round	Position	Pld	W	L	SW	SL	Squad
(United Arab Emirates) 1989	Didn't qualify							
(Portugal) 1991		10th place						Squad
(Turkey) 1993	Didn't qualify							
(Puerto Rico) 1995		9th place						Squad
(Iran) 1997		9th place						Squad
(Saudi Arabia) 1999	Didn't qualify							
(Egypt) 2001	Didn't qualify							
(Thailand) 2003	Didn't qualify							
(Algeria) 2005	Didn't qualify							
(Mexico) 2007		13th place						Squad
(Italy) 2009	Didn't qualify							
(Argentina) 2011		Third place						Squad
(Mexico) 2013		7th place						Squad
(Argentina) 2015		10th place						Squad
(Bahrain) 2017		16th place						Squad
(Tunisia) 2019		12th place						Squad
(Iran) 2021		15th place						
(Argentina) 2023	Didn't qualify							
(Uzbekistan) 2025		17th place	8	3	5	12	15	Squad
Total	0 Titles	11/19						

=== NORCECA Boys U19 Championship ===
Champions Runners up Third place Fourth place

NORCECA Boys U19 Championship
Year	Round	Position	Pld	W	L	SW	SL	Squad
(Dominican Republic) 1998								Squad
(Mexico) 2000								Squad
(Dominican Republic) 2002								Squad
(Mexico) 2004	Final	Champions						Squad
(Dominican Republic) 2006	Semifinal	Third place						Squad
(United States) 2008								Squad
(Mexico) 2010	Final	Champions						Squad
(Mexico) 2012	Final	Champions						Squad
(United States) 2014	Final	Runners-Up						Squad
(Cuba) 2016	Final	Champions						Squad
(Costa Rica) 2018	Final	Champions						Squad
(Puerto Rico) 2024	Final	Runners Up						Squad
(Canada) 2026	Did not enter							
Total	5 Titles	?/13						

== Team ==
=== Current squad ===
The following is the Cuban roster in the 2015 FIVB Volleyball Boys' U19 World Championship.

Head Coach: Jesús Cruz Lopez

No.	Name	Date of birth	Height	Weight	Spike	Block	2015 club
2	Miguel Lopez	25 March 1997	1.89 m (6 ft 2 in)	75 kg (165 lb)	345 cm (136 in)	320 cm (130 in)	(Cuba) Cienfuegos
4	Elieser Rojas	7 January 1997	1.96 m (6 ft 5 in)	71 kg (157 lb)	350 cm (140 in)	345 cm (136 in)	(Cuba) Havana
5	Javier Concepción	27 December 1997	2.00 m (6 ft 7 in)	84 kg (185 lb)	356 cm (140 in)	350 cm (140 in)	(Cuba) Havana
6	Jorge Camejo	28 July 1999	1.87 m (6 ft 2 in)	68 kg (150 lb)	338 cm (133 in)	330 cm (130 in)	(Cuba) Pinar del Río
7	Ismel Pelayo	29 January 1997	1.89 m (6 ft 2 in)	82 kg (181 lb)	349 cm (137 in)	345 cm (136 in)	(Cuba) Matanzas
8	Gustavo Bryan	20 June 1997	1.98 m (6 ft 6 in)	86 kg (190 lb)	358 cm (141 in)	353 cm (139 in)	(Cuba) Guantanamo
9	Lazaro Barrete	2 March 1997	1.98 m (6 ft 6 in)	78 kg (172 lb)	358 cm (141 in)	350 cm (140 in)	(Cuba) Matanzas
12	Raciel Herrera	2 July 1998	1.98 m (6 ft 6 in)	85 kg (187 lb)	345 cm (136 in)	325 cm (128 in)	(Cuba) Pinar del Río
13	Jose Romero	5 January 1999	1.98 m (6 ft 6 in)	85 kg (187 lb)	350 cm (140 in)	325 cm (128 in)	(Cuba) Cienfuegos
15	Adrian Goide (C)	26 June 1998	1.91 m (6 ft 3 in)	80 kg (180 lb)	344 cm (135 in)	340 cm (130 in)	(Cuba) Sancti Spiritus
16	Roamy Alonso	24 July 1997	2.01 m (6 ft 7 in)	93 kg (205 lb)	350 cm (140 in)	330 cm (130 in)	(Cuba) Matanzas
19	Lionnis Salazar	25 July 1997	1.85 m (6 ft 1 in)	77 kg (170 lb)	332 cm (131 in)	332 cm (131 in)	Santiago de Cuba
