= 2018 Boys' Youth NORCECA Volleyball Championship =

Tournament details
- Host country: Costa Rica
- Dates: 4–11 June
- Teams: 7
- Venue(s): National Gymnasium, San Jose, Costa Rica (in 1 host city)

Final positions
- Champions: Cuba (5th title)
- Runners-up: United States
- Third place: Puerto Rico

Tournament awards
- MVP: Christian Thondike

The 2018 Boys' Youth NORCECA Volleyball Championship was the eleventh edition of the bi-annual volleyball tournament. It was held in San Jose, Costa Rica from 4 June to 11 June. Seven countries competed in the tournament. Cuba won the tournament and qualified for the 2019 Boys' U19 World Championship along with the United States. Christian Thondike won the MVP award.

== Pool composition ==
Group A	Group B
Puerto Rico	Cuba
Costa Rica	United States
Nicaragua	Guatemala
	Honduras

== Pool standing procedure ==
1. Number of matches won
2. Match points
3. Points ratio
4. Sets ratio
5. Result of the last match between the tied teams

Match won 3–0: 5 match points for the winner, 0 match points for the loser
Match won 3–1: 4 match points for the winner, 1 match point for the loser
Match won 3–2: 3 match points for the winner, 2 match points for the loser

== Preliminary round ==
- All times are in Central Standard Time - (UTC−06:00)

=== Group A ===
Pos	Team	Pld	W	L	Pts	SPW	SPL	SPR	SW	SL	SR	Qualification
1	Puerto Rico	2	2	0	10	150	84	1.786	6	0	MAX	Semifinals
2	Costa Rica	2	1	1	4	141	160	0.881	3	4	0.750	Quarterfinals
3	Nicaragua	2	0	2	1	128	175	0.731	1	6	0.167	Quarterfinals

Date	Time		Score		Set 1	Set 2	Set 3	Set 4	Set 5	Total	Report
6 June	19:00	Puerto Rico	3–0	Nicaragua	25–12	25–11	25–20			75–43	P2 P3
7 June	19:00	Costa Rica	3–1	Nicaragua	25–21	23–25	25–14	27–25		100–85	P2 P3
8 June	19:00	Costa Rica	0–3	Puerto Rico	13–25	16–25	12–25			41–75	P2 P3

=== Group B ===
Pos	Team	Pld	W	L	Pts	SPW	SPL	SPR	SW	SL	SR	Qualification
1	Cuba	3	3	0	15	228	136	1.676	9	0	MAX	Semifinals
2	United States	3	2	1	10	214	178	1.202	6	3	2.000	Quarterfinals
3	Guatemala	3	1	2	4	196	225	0.871	3	7	0.429	Quarterfinals
4	Honduras	4	0	4	1	149	248	0.601	1	12	0.083	5th–8th classification

Date	Time		Score		Set 1	Set 2	Set 3	Set 4	Set 5	Total	Report
6 June	15:00	Guatemala	0–3	United States	23–25	14–25	18–25			55–75	P2 P3
6 June	17:00	Cuba	3–0	Honduras	25–9	25–10	25–10			75–29	P2 P3
7 June	15:00	Cuba	3–0	Guatemala	25–13	25–12	25–18			75–43	P2 P3
7 June	17:00	Honduras	0–3	United States	16–25	15–25	14–25			45–75	P2 P3
7 June	15:00	Honduras	1–3	Guatemala	21–25	25–23	18–25	11–25		75–98	P2 P3
8 June	17:00	United States	0–3	Cuba	19–25	19–25	26–28			64–78	P2 P3

== Final round ==
=== Bracket ===
Quarterfinals
A2	Costa Rica	2
B3	Guatemala	3
B2	United States	3
A3	Nicaragua	0

Semifinals
B1	Cuba	3
B3	Guatemala	0
A1	Puerto Rico	0
B2	United States	3
Fifth place
A2	Costa Rica	1
A3	Nicaragua	3

Finals
B2	United States	0
B1	Cuba	3
Third place
B3	Guatemala	1
A1	Puerto Rico	3

=== Quarterfinals ===
Date	Time		Score		Set 1	Set 2	Set 3	Set 4	Set 5	Total	Report
9 Jun	9:00	Costa Rica	2–3	Guatemala	23–25	25–22	25–18	25–27	13–15	111–107	P2 P3
9 Jun	11:00	United States	3–0	Nicaragua	25–21	25–14	25–13			75–48	P2 P3

=== Semifinals ===
Date	Time		Score		Set 1	Set 2	Set 3	Set 4	Set 5	Total	Report
9 Jun	17:00	Cuba	3–0	Guatemala	25–10	25–17	25–15			75–42	P2 P3
9 Jun	19:00	Puerto Rico	0–3	United States	17–25	19–25	20–25			56–75	P2 P3

=== 5th place ===
Date	Time		Score		Set 1	Set 2	Set 3	Set 4	Set 5	Total	Report
10 Jun	14:00	Costa Rica	1–3	Nicaragua	25–19	19–25	19–25	9–25		72–94	P2 P3

=== 3rd place ===
Date	Time		Score		Set 1	Set 2	Set 3	Set 4	Set 5	Total	Report
10 Jun	16:00	Guatemala	1–3	Puerto Rico	25–20	19–25	13–25	17–25		74–95	P2 P3

=== Final ===
Date	Time		Score		Set 1	Set 2	Set 3	Set 4	Set 5	Total	Report
10 Jun	18:00	Cuba	3–0	United States	25–17	25–17	25–20			75–54	P2 P3

== Finals standing ==
Qualified to 2019 FIVB Boys' World Championship.

Rank	Team
1st place, gold medalist(s)	Cuba
2nd place, silver medalist(s)	United States
3rd place, bronze medalist(s)	Puerto Rico
4	Guatemala
5	Nicaragua
6	Costa Rica
7	Honduras

== Individual awards ==
- Most valuable player
  - Christian Thondike (CUB)
- Best setter
  - Christian Thondike (CUB)
- Best Opposite
  - Alexei Ramirez (CUB)
- Best Outside Hitters
  - José Gutiérrez (CUB)
  - Victor Andreu (CUB)
- Best Middle Blockers
  - Luis Allen (CUB)
  - Yeico Jiménez (CRC)
- Best libero
  - Jordan Carcache (NIC)
- Best digger
  - Jordan Carcache (NIC)
- Best receiver
  - Ricardo Gómez (CUB)
- Best server
  - Christian Thondike (CUB)
- Best scorer
  - David Ismalej (GUA)
