= 2024 Boys U19 NORCECA Continental Championship =

Tournament details
- Host country: Puerto Rico
- Dates: 12–20 May
- Teams: 8
- Venue: (in 1 host city)

Final positions
- Champions: United States (3rd title)
- Runners-up: Cuba
- Third place: Puerto Rico
- Fourth place: Canada

Tournament awards
- MVP: (United States) Aleksey Mikhailenko

The 2024 Boys U19 NORCECA Continental Championship was the twelfth edition of the bi-annual volleyball tournament. It was held in Ponce, Puerto Rico from 12 to 20 May. Eight countries competed in the tournament. The United States won the tournament with third titles. Aleksey Mikhailenko of the United States won the MVP award.

== Preliminary round ==
=== Group A ===
Pos	Team	Pld	W	L	Pts	SPW	SPL	SPR	SW	SL	SR	Qualification
1	United States	3	3	0	15	225	158	1.424	9	0	MAX	Semifinals
2	Cuba	3	2	1	8	243	240	1.013	6	5	1.200	Quarterfinals
3	Canada	3	1	2	6	268	253	1.059	5	7	0.714	Quarterfinals
4	Suriname	3	0	3	1	169	254	0.665	1	9	0.111	

Date	Time		Score		Set 1	Set 2	Set 3	Set 4	Set 5	Total	Report
14 May	14:00	Cuba	3–0	Suriname	25–12	25–19	29–27			79–58	P2 P3
14 May	16:00	United States	3–0	Canada	25–23	25–15	25–23			75–61	P2 P3
15 May	14:00	Suriname	0–3	United States	13–25	11–25	16–25			40–75	P3
15 May	16:00	Canada	2–3	Cuba	25–19	25–23	21–25	23–25	13–15	107–107	P2 P3
16 May	14:00	Canada	3–1	Suriname	25–13	22–25	25–7	28–26		100–71	P2 P3
16 May	16:00	United States	3–0	Cuba	25–22	25–17	25–18			75–57	P2 P3

=== Group B ===
Pos	Team	Pld	W	L	Pts	SPW	SPL	SPR	SW	SL	SR	Qualification
1	Puerto Rico	3	3	0	12	281	234	1.201	9	3	3.000	Semifinals
2	Costa Rica	3	2	1	10	299	274	1.091	8	5	1.600	Quarterfinals
3	Dominican Republic	3	1	2	5	240	258	0.930	4	7	0.571	Quarterfinals
4	Guatemala	3	0	3	3	243	297	0.818	3	9	0.333	

Date	Time		Score		Set 1	Set 2	Set 3	Set 4	Set 5	Total	Report
14 May	18:00	Guatemala	1–3	Dominican Republic	26–24	24–26	13–25	19–25		82–100	P2 P3
14 May	20:00	Costa Rica	2–3	Puerto Rico	22–25	22–25	25–23	25–18	7–15	101–106	P2 P3
15 May	18:00	Dominican Republic	1–3	Costa Rica	20–25	27–29	25–22	19–25		91–101	P2 P3
15 May	20:00	Puerto Rico	3–1	Guatemala	25–13	26–24	24–26	25–21		100–84	P2 P3
16 May	18:00	Guatemala	1–3	Costa Rica	19–25	14–25	25–22	19–25		77–97	P2 P3
16 May	20:00	Dominican Republic	0–3	Puerto Rico	23–25	13–25	13–25			49–75	P2 P3

== Final round ==
=== Bracket ===
Quarterfinals
Costa Rica	2
Canada	3
Dominican Republic	1
Cuba	3

Semifinals
United States	3
Canada	0
Puerto Rico	2
Cuba	3

Finals
United States	3
Cuba	1
Third place
Canada	2
Puerto Rico	3

=== Quarterfinals ===
Date	Time		Score		Set 1	Set 2	Set 3	Set 4	Set 5	Total	Report
17 May	18:00	Costa Rica	2–3	Canada	21–25	25–19	22–25	25–23	13–15	106–107	P2 P3
17 May	20:00	Cuba	3–1	Dominican Republic	25–15	20–25	28–26	25–14		98–80	P2 P3

=== Classification 5th–8th ===
Date	Time		Score		Set 1	Set 2	Set 3	Set 4	Set 5	Total	Report
18 May	14:00	Guatemala	0–3	Costa Rica	15–25	15–25	5–25			35–75	P2 P3
18 May	16:00	Suriname	0–3	Dominican Republic	24–26	19–25	18–25			61–76	P2 P3

=== Semifinals ===
Date	Time		Score		Set 1	Set 2	Set 3	Set 4	Set 5	Total	Report
18 May	18:00	United States	3–0	Canada	25–23	26–24	29–27			80–74	P2 P3
18 May	20:00	Puerto Rico	2–3	Cuba	14–25	25–22	16–25	25–23	8–15	88–110	P2 P3

=== 7th place ===
Date	Time		Score		Set 1	Set 2	Set 3	Set 4	Set 5	Total	Report
19 May	12:00	Guatemala	3–0	Suriname	25–22	25–17	25–14			75–53	P2 P3

=== 5th place ===
Date	Time		Score		Set 1	Set 2	Set 3	Set 4	Set 5	Total	Report
19 May	14:00	Costa Rica	2–3	Dominican Republic	25–23	14–25	25–27	25–21	8–15	97–111	P2 P3

=== 3rd place ===
Date	Time		Score		Set 1	Set 2	Set 3	Set 4	Set 5	Total	Report
19 May	16:00	Puerto Rico	3–2	Canada	23–25	25–20	25–20	20–25	15–9	108–99	P2 P3

=== Final ===
Date	Time		Score		Set 1	Set 2	Set 3	Set 4	Set 5	Total	Report
19 May	18:00	Cuba	1–3	United States	19–25	19–25	25–20	18–25		81–95	P2 P3

== Finals standing ==
Rank	Team
1st place, gold medalist(s)	United States
2nd place, silver medalist(s)	Cuba
3rd place, bronze medalist(s)	Puerto Rico
4	Canada
5	Dominican Republic
6	Costa Rica
7	Guatemala
8	Suriname

== Individual awards ==
- Most valuable player
  - Aleksey Mikhailenko (USA)
- Best spiker
  - Aleksey Mikhailenko (USA)
- Best blocker
  - Roman Payne (USA)
- Best setter
  - Rafael Urbina (USA)
- Best opposite
  - Malik Britton (DOM)
- Best libero
  - Yandy Rodriguez (DOM)
- Best receiver
  - Bluth Laxton (USA)
- Best digger
  - Yandy Rodriguez (DOM)
- Best server
  - Thomas Demps (USA)
- Best scorer
  - Stanley Grant (CRC)
