= 2022 Boys U19 NORCECA Pan American Cup =

Tournament details
- Host country: Guatemala
- Dates: 21–29 May 2022
- Teams: 8
- Venue: (in Guatemala City host cities)

Final positions
- Champions: United States (1st title)
- Runners-up: Mexico
- Third place: Puerto Rico

Tournament awards
- MVP: Sean Kelly (USA)

Another 2022 Boys U19 NORCECA Pan American Cup official logo.

The 2022 Boys U19 NORCECA Pan American Cup was the fourth edition of the bi-annual men's volleyball tournament. Eight teams participated in this edition held in Guatemala City.

The United States won their first title, after defeated Mexico 3–0 in the final. Sean Kelley of the United States won the Most valuable player award.

== Preliminary round ==
=== Group A ===
Pos	Team	Pld	W	L	Pts	SPW	SPL	SPR	SW	SL	SR	Qualification
1	Puerto Rico	3	3	0	14	251	180	1.394	9	1	9.000	Semifinals
2	Guatemala	3	2	1	9	225	211	1.066	6	4	1.500	Quarterfinals
3	Dominican Republic	3	1	2	7	248	255	0.973	5	6	0.833	Quarterfinals
4	Honduras	3	0	3	0	149	227	0.656	0	9	0.000	

Date	Time		Score		Set 1	Set 2	Set 3	Set 4	Set 5	Total	Report
23 May	16:00	Puerto Rico	3–1	Dominican Republic	26–28	25–21	25–20	25–16		101–85	P2 P3
23 May	20:00	Guatemala	3–0	Honduras	25–18	25–18	25–14			75–50	P2 P3
24 May	16:00	Puerto Rico	3–0	Honduras	25–10	25–14	25–15			75–39	P2 P3
24 May	20:00	Guatemala	3–1	Dominican Republic	25–23	25–17	19–25	25–21		94–86	P2 P3
25 May	16:00	Dominican Republic	3–0	Honduras	25–15	25–20	27–25			77–60	P2 P3
25 May	20:00	Guatemala	0–3	Puerto Rico	18–25	18–25	20–25			56–75	P2 P3

=== Group B ===
Pos	Team	Pld	W	L	Pts	SPW	SPL	SPR	SW	SL	SR	Qualification
1	United States	3	3	0	15	226	150	1.507	9	0	MAX	Semifinals
2	Mexico	3	2	1	9	211	210	1.005	6	4	1.500	Quarterfinals
3	Chile	3	1	2	5	233	259	0.900	4	7	0.571	Quarterfinals
4	Costa Rica	3	0	3	1	199	250	0.796	1	9	0.111	

Date	Time		Score		Set 1	Set 2	Set 3	Set 4	Set 5	Total	Report
23 May	14:00	Costa Rica	0–3	Mexico	20–25	18–25	15–25			53–75	P2 P3
23 May	18:00	Chile	0–3	United States	24–26	16–25	11–25			51–76	P2 P3
24 May	14:00	Costa Rica	0–3	United States	20–25	17–25	15–25			52–75	P2 P3
24 May	18:00	Chile	1–3	Mexico	17–25	25–14	22–25	18–25		82–89	P2 P3
25 May	14:00	Costa Rica	1–3	Chile	24–26	21–25	25–23	24–26		94–100	P2 P3
25 May	18:00	United States	3–0	Mexico	25–21	25–13	25–13			75–47	P2 P3

== Final round ==
=== Championship bracket ===
Quarterfinals
B2	Mexico	3
A3	Dominican Republic	0
A2	Guatemala	0
B3	Chile	3

Semifinals
B2	Mexico	3
A1	Puerto Rico	2
B1	United States	3
B3	Chile	0

Final
B2	Mexico	0
B1	United States	3
Third place
A1	Puerto Rico	3
B3	Chile	0

=== Quarterfinals ===
Date	Time		Score		Set 1	Set 2	Set 3	Set 4	Set 5	Total	Report
26 May	18:00	Mexico	3–0	Dominican Republic	25–22	25–16	25–17			75–55	P2 P3
26 May	20:00	Guatemala	1–3	Chile	15–25	13–25	25–19	20–25		73–94	P2 P3

=== Classification 5th–8th ===
Date	Time		Score		Set 1	Set 2	Set 3	Set 4	Set 5	Total	Report
27 May	14:00	Costa Rica	3–1	Dominican Republic	25–15	25–13	25–27	25–19		100–74	P2 P3
27 May	16:00	Honduras	0–3	Guatemala	13–25	24–26	15–25			52–76	P2 P3

=== Semifinals ===
Date	Time		Score		Set 1	Set 2	Set 3	Set 4	Set 5	Total	Report
27 May	18:00	United States	3–0	Chile	25–18	25–18	25–20			75–56	P2 P3
27 May	20:00	Puerto Rico	2–3	Mexico	19–25	19–25	25–20	25–18	15–17	103–105	P2 P3

=== Seventh place match ===
Date	Time		Score		Set 1	Set 2	Set 3	Set 4	Set 5	Total	Report
28 May	12:00	Dominican Republic	3–1	Honduras	19–25	25–13	25–12	25–13		94–63	P2 P3

=== Fifth place match ===
Date	Time		Score		Set 1	Set 2	Set 3	Set 4	Set 5	Total	Report
28 May	14:00	Costa Rica	3–0	Guatemala	25–19	30–28	29–27			84–74	P2 P3

=== Bronze medal match ===
Date	Time		Score		Set 1	Set 2	Set 3	Set 4	Set 5	Total	Report
28 May	16:00	Chile	0–3	Puerto Rico	17–25	19–25	19–25			55–75	P2 P3

=== Final ===
Date	Time		Score		Set 1	Set 2	Set 3	Set 4	Set 5	Total	Report
28 May	18:00	United States	3–0	Mexico	25–22	25–18	25–18			75–58	P2 P3

== Final standing ==
Rank	Team
1st place, gold medalist(s)	United States
2nd place, silver medalist(s)	Mexico
3rd place, bronze medalist(s)	Puerto Rico
4	Chile
5	Costa Rica
6	Guatemala
7	Dominican Republic
8	Honduras

Qualified for FIVB U19 World Championship

== Individual awards ==
- Most valuable player
  - Sean Kelly (USA)
- Best scorer
  - Franklyn Reyes (DOM)
- Best setter
  - Tread Rosenthal (USA)
- Best Opposite
  - Finn Kearney (USA)
- Best outside hitters
  - Sean Kelly (USA)
  - Víctor Torres (PUR)
- Best middle blockers
  - David Córdoba (CRC)
  - Goran Rafaeli (CHI)
- Best libero
  - Kellen Larson (USA)
- Best server
  - Finn Kearney (USA)
- Best receiver
  - Kellen Larson (USA)
- Best digger
  - Kellen Larson (USA)
