= 2019 Boys' Youth Pan-American Volleyball Cup =

Tournament details
- Host country: Dominican Republic
- Dates: April 22–30, 2019
- Teams: 7

Final positions
- Champions: Cuba (1st title)

Tournament awards
- MVP: José Miguel Gutierrez (CUB)

The 2019 Boys' Youth Pan-American Volleyball Cup was the third edition of the bi-annual Continental Cup, played by seven countries from April 22–30, 2019 in Santo Domingo, Dominican Republic. Cuba won the tournament beating Mexico in the finals. As Cuba had already qualified for the U19 World Championship through the NORCECA Championship, Mexico and the Dominican Republic qualified instead. Jose Miguel Gutierrez won the MVP award.

== Competing nations ==
Group A	Group B
Cuba; Dominican Republic; Guatemala; Nicaragua	Mexico; Chile; Puerto Rico

== Preliminary round ==
- All times are in Eastern Standard Time (UTC−04:00)

=== Group A ===
Pos	Team	Pld	W	L	Pts	SPW	SPL	SPR	SW	SL	SR	Qualification
1	Cuba	3	3	0	15	225	130	1.731	9	0	MAX	Semifinals
2	Dominican Republic	3	2	1	10	198	168	1.179	6	3	2.000	Quarterfinals
3	Guatemala	3	1	2	5	168	200	0.840	3	6	0.500	Quarterfinals
4	Nicaragua	3	0	3	0	132	225	0.587	0	9	0.000	

Date	Time		Score		Set 1	Set 2	Set 3	Set 4	Set 5	Total	Report
24 Apr	15:00	Nicaragua	0–3	Cuba	12–25	11–25	12–25			35–75	P2 P3
24 Apr	19:00	Dominican Republic	3–0	Guatemala	25–10	25–19	25–17			75–46	P2 P3
25 Apr	15:00	Guatemala	3–0	Nicaragua	25–11	25–23	25–16			75–50	P2 P3
25 Apr	19:00	Dominican Republic	0–3	Cuba	15–25	17–25	16–25			48–75	P2 P3
26 Apr	15:00	Cuba	3–0	Guatemala	25–12	25–21	25–15			75–48	P2 P3
26 Apr	19:00	Dominican Republic	3–1	Nicaragua	25–7	25–20	25–20			75–47	P2 P3

=== Group B ===
Pos	Team	Pld	W	L	Pts	SPW	SPL	SPR	SW	SL	SR	Qualification
1	Mexico	2	2	0	8	191	163	1.172	6	2	3.000	Semifinals
2	Chile	2	1	1	5	177	184	0.962	4	4	1.000	Quarterfinals
3	Puerto Rico	2	0	2	2	174	195	0.892	2	6	0.333	Quarterfinals

Date	Time		Score		Set 1	Set 2	Set 3	Set 4	Set 5	Total	Report
24 Apr	17:00	Puerto Rico	1–3	Chile	25–23	19–25	21–25	24–26		89–99	P2 P3
25 Apr	17:00	Chile	1–3	Mexico	25–20	22–25	16–25	15–25		78–95	P2 P3
26 Apr	17:00	Mexico	3–1	Puerto Rico	25–21	25–19	21–25	25–20		96–85	P2 P3

== Final round ==
=== Championship bracket ===
Quarterfinals
B2	Chile	3
A3	Guatemala	0
A2	Dominican Republic	3
B3	Puerto Rico	2

Semifinals
B2	Chile	0
A1	Cuba	3
A2	Dominican Republic	1
B1	Mexico	3

Finals
A1	Cuba	3
B1	Mexico	0
Third place
A2	Dominican Republic	3
B2	Chile	1

=== Quarterfinals ===
Date	Time		Score		Set 1	Set 2	Set 3	Set 4	Set 5	Total	Report
27 Apr	15:00	Chile	3–0	Guatemala	25–22	25–12	25–15			75–49	P2 P3
27 Apr	17:00	Dominican Republic	3–2	Puerto Rico	17–25	21–25	27–25	25–23	15–12	105–110	P2 P3

=== Semifinals ===
Date	Time		Score		Set 1	Set 2	Set 3	Set 4	Set 5	Total	Report
28 Apr	17:00	Mexico	3–1	Dominican Republic	25–27	25–21	25–9	25–21		100–78	P2 P3
28 Apr	15:00	Cuba	3–0	Chile	25–11	25–21	25–20			75–52	P2 P3

=== Seventh place match ===
Date	Time		Score		Set 1	Set 2	Set 3	Set 4	Set 5	Total	Report
29 Apr	13:00	Nicaragua	1–3	Guatemala	22–25	17–25	25–17	17–25		81–92	P2 P3

=== Fifth place match ===
Date	Time		Score		Set 1	Set 2	Set 3	Set 4	Set 5	Total	Report
28 Apr	13:00	Guatemala	0–3	Puerto Rico	21–25	19–25	21–25			61–75	

=== Bronze medal match ===
Date	Time		Score		Set 1	Set 2	Set 3	Set 4	Set 5	Total	Report
29 Apr	15:00	Dominican Republic	3–1	Chile	25–22	22–25	25–16	26–24		98–87	P2 P3

=== Final ===
Date	Time		Score		Set 1	Set 2	Set 3	Set 4	Set 5	Total	Report
29 Apr	17:00	Mexico	0–3	Cuba	18–25	24–26	19–25			61–76	P2 P3

== Final standing ==
Rank	Team
1st place, gold medalist(s)	Cuba
2nd place, silver medalist(s)	Mexico
3rd place, bronze medalist(s)	Dominican Republic
4	Chile
5	Puerto Rico
6	Guatemala
7	Nicaragua

Qualified for FIVB U19 World Championship

2019 Boys' Youth Pan-American Cup champions

Cuba
1st title

Team Roster:

Miguel Gutierrez, Christian Thondike, Adrian Chirino, Ricardo Gomez, Yoel Bolaños, Reynier Ibar, Alejandro Gonzalez, Francisco Valle, Vidal Allen, Alexei Ramirez, Ramon Andreu,

Eduardo Hernandez
Head Coach: (Cuba) Mario Izquierdo

== Individual awards ==
- Most valuable player
  - José Miguel Gutiérrez (CUB)
- Best scorer
  - Fuhit Edouarde (DOM)
- Best setter
  - Christian Thondike (CUB)
- Best server
  - José Miguel Gutiérrez (CUB)
- Best outside hitters
  - Victor Andreu (CUB)
  - José Miguel Gutiérrez (CUB)
- Best middle blockers
  - Luis Vidal Allen (CUB)
  - Dawiin Méndez (DOM)
- Best Opposite
  - Eduardo Hernández (CUB)
- Best libero
  - Ricardo Gómez (CUB)
- Best receiver
  - Gabriel Pantoja (PUR)
- Best digger
  - Jordan Carcaché (NIC)
