= 2025 Boys U19 NORCECA Pan American Cup =

Tournament details
- Host country: Mexico
- Dates: 6–14 July 2025
- Teams: 8
- Venue: (in Cuernavaca, Morelos host cities)

Final positions
- Champions: United States (3rd title)
- Runners-up: Mexico
- Third place: Canada

Tournament awards
- MVP: Blake Fahlbusch (USA)

The 2025 Boys U19 NORCECA Pan American Cup was the sixth edition of the bi-annual men's volleyball tournament. Eight teams participated in this edition held in Cuernavaca, Morelos.

The United States won their third consecutive title, after defeated Mexico 3–0 in the final. Blake Fahlbusch of the United States won the Most Valuable Player award.

== Preliminary round ==
=== Group A ===
Pos	Team	Pld	W	L	Pts	SPW	SPL	SPR	SW	SL	SR	Qualification
1	United States	3	3	0	14	254	201	1.264	9	1	9.000	Semifinals
2	Venezuela	3	2	1	10	256	257	0.996	7	4	1.750	Quarterfinals
3	Canada	3	1	2	6	228	235	0.970	4	6	0.667	Quarterfinals
4	Puerto Rico	3	0	3	0	180	225	0.800	0	9	0.000	

Date	Time		Score		Set 1	Set 2	Set 3	Set 4	Set 5	Total	Report
8 July	14:00	United States	3–1	Venezuela	20–25	25–18	25–16	32–30		102–89	P2 P3
8 July	16:00	Puerto Rico	0–3	Canada	23–25	20–25	23–25			66–75	P2 P3
9 July	14:00	Puerto Rico	0–3	Venezuela	23–25	19–25	22–25			64–75	P2 P3
9 July	16:00	United States	3–0	Canada	25–20	27–25	25–17			77–62	P2 P3
10 July	14:00	Canada	1–3	Venezuela	22–25	22–25	25–17	22–25		91–92	P2 P3
10 July	16:00	United States	3–0	Puerto Rico	25–17	25–14	25–19			75–50	P2 P3

=== Group B ===
Pos	Team	Pld	W	L	Pts	SPW	SPL	SPR	SW	SL	SR	Qualification
1	Mexico	3	3	0	14	251	193	1.301	9	1	9.000	Semifinals
2	Chile	3	2	1	10	218	174	1.253	6	3	2.000	Quarterfinals
3	Suriname	3	1	2	5	211	251	0.841	4	7	0.571	Quarterfinals
4	Panama	3	0	3	1	179	241	0.743	1	9	0.111	

Date	Time		Score		Set 1	Set 2	Set 3	Set 4	Set 5	Total	Report
8 July	18:00	Chile	3–0	Suriname	25–14	25–17	25–14			75–45	P2 P3
8 July	20:00	Mexico	3–0	Panama	25–14	25–22	25–14			75–50	P2 P3
9 July	18:00	Chile	3–0	Panama	25–19	25–14	25–17			75–50	P2 P3
9 July	20:00	Mexico	3–1	Suriname	25–23	25–16	22–25	25–11		97–75	P2 P3
10 July	18:00	Suriname	3–1	Panama	16–25	25–18	25–23	25–13		91–79	P2 P3
10 July	20:00	Mexico	3–0	Chile	25–22	25–19	29–27			79–68	P2 P3

== Final round ==
=== Championship bracket ===
Quarterfinals
A2	Venezuela	3
B3	Suriname	0
B2	Chile	1
A3	Canada	3

Semifinals
A2	Venezuela	1
B1	Mexico	3
A1	United States	3
A3	Canada	0

Final
B1	Mexico	0
A1	United States	3
Third place
A2	Venezuela	0
A3	Canada	3

=== Quarterfinals ===
Date	Time		Score		Set 1	Set 2	Set 3	Set 4	Set 5	Total	Report
11 July	17:00	Venezuela	3–0	Suriname	25–15	25–14	25–17			75–46	P2 P3
11 July	19:00	Chile	1–3	Canada	17–25	20–25	25–22	19–25		81–97	P2 P3

=== Classification 5th–8th ===
Date	Time		Score		Set 1	Set 2	Set 3	Set 4	Set 5	Total	Report
12 July	14:00	Puerto Rico	3–0	Suriname	25–18	25–22	25–16			75–56	P2 P3
12 July	16:00	Panama	1–3	Chile	21–25	17–25	25–21	13–25		76–96	P2 P3

=== Semifinals ===
Date	Time		Score		Set 1	Set 2	Set 3	Set 4	Set 5	Total	Report
12 July	18:00	United States	3–0	Canada	25–18	25–18	25–17			75–53	P2 P3
12 July	20:00	Mexico	3–1	Venezuela	25–19	19–25	25–23	29–27		98–94	P2 P3

=== Seventh place match ===
Date	Time		Score		Set 1	Set 2	Set 3	Set 4	Set 5	Total	Report
13 July	10:00	Suriname	2–3	Panama	25–22	19–25	25–12	22–25	8–15	99–99	P2 P3

=== Fifth place match ===
Date	Time		Score		Set 1	Set 2	Set 3	Set 4	Set 5	Total	Report
13 July	12:00	Puerto Rico	3–2	Chile	21–25	25–23	22–25	25–23	15–12	108–108	P2 P3

=== Bronze medal match ===
Date	Time		Score		Set 1	Set 2	Set 3	Set 4	Set 5	Total	Report
13 July	14:00	Canada	3–0	Venezuela	25–15	26–24	25–18			76–57	P2 P3

=== Final ===
Date	Time		Score		Set 1	Set 2	Set 3	Set 4	Set 5	Total	Report
13 July	16:00	United States	3–0	Mexico	25–20	25–21	25–18			75–59	P2 P3

== Final standing ==
Rank	Team
1st place, gold medalist(s)	United States
2nd place, silver medalist(s)	Mexico
3rd place, bronze medalist(s)	Canada
4	Venezuela
5	Puerto Rico
6	Chile
7	Panama
8	Suriname

== Individual awards ==
- Most valuable player
  - Blake Fahlbusch (USA)
- Best scorer
  - Joaquin Valjalo (CHI)
- Best setter
  - Juan Pablo Espinosa (CHI)
- Best Opposite
  - Joaquin Valjalo (CHI)
- Best spikers
  - Carlos Grajeda (MEX)
  - Emi Diaz (MEX)
- Best middle blockers
  - Isiah Powell (USA)
  - Alonso Castello (PUR)
- Best libero
  - Rolando Bello (VEN)
- Best server
  - Juan Pablo Espinosa (CHI)
- Best receiver
  - Benjamin Bayer (USA)
- Best digger
  - Esteban Castillo (CHI)
