= 2014 Boys' Youth NORCECA Volleyball Championship =

Tournament details
- Host country: United States
- Dates: July 12–20, 2014
- Teams: 7
- Venue: 1 (in Tulsa host cities)

Final positions
- Champions: United States (2nd title)

Tournament awards
- MVP: Torey Defalco (USA)

The 2014 Boys' Youth NORCECA Volleyball Championship was the ninth edition of the bi-annual men's volleyball tournament, played by nine countries from July 12–20, 2014 in Tulsa, Oklahoma, United States. The United States won this second title. USA, Cuba and Mexico qualified to the 2015 FIVB Boys' World Championship.

== Competing nations ==
Group A	Group B
Puerto Rico; United States; Nicaragua	Barbados; Mexico; Guatemala; Cuba

== Pool standing procedure ==
Match won 3–0: 5 points for the winner, 0 point for the loser
Match won 3–1: 4 points for the winner, 1 points for the loser
Match won 3–2: 3 points for the winner, 2 points for the loser
In case of tie, the teams were classified according to the following criteria:
points ratio and sets ratio

== First round ==
Team advances to semifinals
Team advances to quarterfinals

=== Pool A ===
Pos	Team	Pld	W	L	Pts	SPW	SPL	SPR	SW	SL	SR	Qualification
1	United States	2	2	0	10	150	90	1.667	6	0	MAX	Semifinals
2	Puerto Rico	2	1	1	5	133	135	0.985	3	3	1.000	Quarterfinals
3	Nicaragua	2	0	2	0	97	155	0.626	0	6	0.000	Quarterfinals

Date	Time		Score		Set 1	Set 2	Set 3	Set 4	Set 5	Total	Report
14-jul	18:00	United States	3–0	Nicaragua	25–13	25–11	25–13			75–37	P2P3
15-jul	14:00	Nicaragua	0–3	Puerto Rico	14–25	28–30	18–25			60–80	P2P3
16-jul	18:00	United States	3–0	Puerto Rico	25–17	25–18	25–18			75–53	P2P3

=== Pool B ===
Pos	Team	Pld	W	L	Pts	SPW	SPL	SPR	SW	SL	SR	Qualification
1	Cuba	3	3	0	13	247	190	1.300	9	2	4.500	Semifinals
2	Mexico	3	2	1	12	250	187	1.337	8	3	2.667	Quarterfinals
3	Guatemala	3	1	2	3	190	259	0.734	3	8	0.375	Quarterfinals
4	Barbados	3	0	3	2	207	258	0.802	2	9	0.222	

Date	Time		Score		Set 1	Set 2	Set 3	Set 4	Set 5	Total	Report
14-jul	12:00	Barbados	0–3	Mexico	17–25	16–25	14–25			47–75	P2P3
14-jul	16:00	Guatemala	0–3	Cuba	14–25	12–25	13–25			39–75	P2P3
15-jul	12:00	Cuba	3–0	Barbados	25–13	25–21	25–17			75–51	P2P3
15-jul	16:00	Mexico	3–0	Guatemala	25–16	25–15	25–12			75–43	P2P3
16-jul	12:00	Guatemala	3–2	Barbados	25–21	18–25	24–26	26–24	15–13	108–109	P2P3
16-jul	16:00	Cuba	3–2	Mexico	25–17	19–25	10–25	25–17	18–16	97–100	P2P3

== Final round ==
=== Championship bracket ===
Quarterfinals
B2	Mexico	3
A3	Nicaragua	0
A2	Puerto Rico	3
B3	Guatemala	0

Semifinals
A1	United States	3
B2	Mexico	0
B1	Cuba	3
A2	Puerto Rico	0
Classification 5–6
A3	Nicaragua	3
B3	Guatemala	0

Finals
A1	United States	3
B1	Cuba	0
Classification 3–4
B2	Mexico	3
A2	Puerto Rico	2

=== Quarterfinals ===
Date	Time		Score		Set 1	Set 2	Set 3	Set 4	Set 5	Total	Report
17-jul	14:00	Mexico	3–0	Nicaragua	25–18	25–17	25–22			75–57	P2P3
17-jul	16:00	Puerto Rico	3–0	Guatemala	25–15	25–16	25–11			75–42	P2P3

=== Semifinals ===
Date	Time		Score		Set 1	Set 2	Set 3	Set 4	Set 5	Total	Report
18-jul	16:00	Cuba	3–0	Puerto Rico	25–21	25–17	25–15			75–53	P2P3
18-jul	18:00	United States	3–0	Mexico	25–22	25–14	25–21			75–57	P2P3

=== Classification 5-6 ===
Date	Time		Score		Set 1	Set 2	Set 3	Set 4	Set 5	Total	Report
18-jul	14:00	Nicaragua	3–0	Guatemala	25–21	25–18	28–26			78–65	P2P3

=== Classification 3-4 ===
Date	Time		Score		Set 1	Set 2	Set 3	Set 4	Set 5	Total	Report
19-jul	16:00	Mexico	3–2	Puerto Rico	22–25	25–21	27–25	16–25	15–6	105–102	P2P3

=== Final ===
Date	Time		Score		Set 1	Set 2	Set 3	Set 4	Set 5	Total	Report
19-jul	18:00	United States	3–0	Cuba	25–23	25–21	25–20			75–64	P2P3

== Final standing ==
Rank	Team
1st place, gold medalist(s)	United States
2nd place, silver medalist(s)	Cuba
3rd place, bronze medalist(s)	Mexico
4	Puerto Rico
5	Nicaragua
6	Guatemala
7	Barbados

== All-Star Team ==
- Most valuable player
  - Torey DeFalco (USA)
- Best setter
  - Micah Maʻa (USA)
- Best Opposite
  - Miguel Gutierrez (CUB)
- Best outside hitters
  - Torey DeFalco (USA)
  - Andriy Stapleton (BAR)
- Best middle blockers
  - Javier Concepción (CUB)
  - Scott Stadick (USA)
- Best libero
  - Miguel Castillo (NCA)
