= Costa Rica men's national volleyball team =

National volleyball team

Costa Rica
- Association: Costa Rica Volleyball Association
- Confederation: NORCECA
- Head coach: Juan Acuna

Uniforms
Home	Away

Summer Olympics
- Appearances: N/A
- www.fecovol.co.cr

The Costa Rica men's national volleyball team represents Costa Rica in international volleyball competitions and friendly matches.

The team is currently ranked 48 in the world. It is governed by the Federación Costarricense de Voleibol (Costa Rican Federation of Volleyball) and takes part in international volleyball competitions. Costa Rica has multiple championships in the Centroamerican area organized by the AFECAVOL.

== Team ==
=== Current squad ===
The following is the 2016-2017 national team shortlist for the NORCECA championship, Panamerican Cup, WCQT and the Centroamerican Games in 2017.

Head Coach: Juan Acuña

Name	Position	2016-2017 Club
Cesar Gomez Lopez	Opuesto	Atenas
Jason Brown Campos	Centro	Atenas
Javier Alvarez Lopez	Centro	Briescrest University Canada
Emanuel Arroyo Valle	Centro	Cartago
Julio Alvarez Lopez	Punta	Cartago
Hugo Rodriguez Naranjo	Centro	Universidad Nacional
Andres Araya Urbina	Colocador	San Jose
Richard Smith Hall	Punta	San Jose
Carlos Quesda Prieto	Colocador	Uned
Luis Chaves Rodriguez	Libero	Atenas
Luis Felipe Gutierrez Mora	Colocador	Atenas
Victor Alpizar Campos	Colocador	Atenas
Fabian Alberto Estrada Duran	Centro	Cartago
Luis Padilla Loria	Colocador	Cartago
Walter Serrano Concepcion	Punta	Cartago
Alberto Blanco Segnini	Punta	San Jose
Cristopher Arias Obregon	Punta	San Jose
Esteban Araya Urbina	Opuesto	San Jose
Pablo Acuña Campos	Libero	San Jose
Luis Antonio Lopez Camacho	Centro	San Jose
Felipe Leon Bermudez	Centro	San Jose
Joaquin Arguedas Salas	Punta	Atenas
Kevin Hidalgo Prendas	Opuesto	Santa Barbara
Fabian Guerra Esquivel	Punta	Universidad De Costa Rica
Brayan Monge Leandro	Punta	Universidad Nacional
Luis Ricardo Chan Gamboa	Centro	Alajuela
