= Philippines men's national under-19 volleyball team =

Men's national under-19 volleyball team representing Philippines

Philippines Under-19
- Nickname(s): Alas Pilipinas (lit. 'Philippine Aces')
- Association: Philippine National Volleyball Federation (PNVF)
- Confederation: AVC
- Head coach: (Brazil) Sergio Veloso

Uniforms
Home	Away	Third

FIVB U19 World Championship
- Appearances: None

Asian U18 Volleyball Championship
- Appearances: 4 (First in 1997)
- Best result: 8th (1997, 1999)

The Philippines men's national under-19 volleyball team represents the Philippines in men's under-18/19 volleyball events. It is controlled and managed by the Philippine National Volleyball Federation (PNVF), which is a member of the Asian volleyball body Asian Volleyball Confederation (AVC) and the international volleyball body government the Fédération Internationale de Volleyball (FIVB).

== Team image ==
=== Names ===
Nicknames
Nickname	In use
Alas Pilipinas Boys	2024–present

The Philippine men's national under-19 team is known by their moniker "Alas Pilipinas", with Alas meaning "Ace" in Filipino. The nickname is an official designation by the Philippine National Volleyball Federation in partnership with sponsor Cignal TV. Adopted on May 15, 2024, the moniker is shared with all national indoor and beach volleyball teams of the Philippines, including the youth teams.

== Rankings ==
This is the current ranking of the under-19 volleyball team of the Philippines in FIVB World Rankings.

FIVB Boys' U19 Ranking as of 24 August 2023
Rank	Team	Points	Confederation
61	Philippines	0	AVC
61	Canada	0	NORCECA
61	Switzerland	0	CEV

== Current roster ==
Philippine National U19 Volleyball Team for 2024 Men's Asian U18 Volleyball Championship
Position	Name	Date of birth	Height	Current team
OH	Tyler Jessie Ramos (c)	November 17, 2007 (age 18)	1.86 m (6 ft 1 in)	FEU–D Baby Tamaraws
OH	Terrence Jame Marticion	June 19, 2009 (age 17)	1.88 m (6 ft 2 in)	VNS Savouge Baby Griffins
OH	Lance Danielle Babon	September 20, 2007 (age 19)	1.85 m (6 ft 1 in)	UE Junior Warriors
OH	Luke Anton Carl Macatangay	July 28, 2007 (age 19)	1.85 m (6 ft 1 in)	Canossa Academy-Lipa V.C.
MB	Rain Dela Paz	February 21, 2007 (age 19)	1.90 m (6 ft 3 in)	UST Tiger Cubs
MB	Julius Jao Arcillo	July 28, 2008 (age 18)	1.85 m (6 ft 1 in)	VNS Savouge Baby Griffins
MB	Clarence John Hades Gianan	September 20, 2007 (age 19)	1.85 m (6 ft 1 in)	UE Junior Warriors
MB	Eligio Naguit III	November 16, 2007 (age 18)	1.86 m (6 ft 1 in)	FEU–D Baby Tamaraws
OP	Roderick Medino	November 28, 2008 (age 17)	1.86 m (6 ft 1 in)	VNS Savouge Baby Griffins
S	John Howard Guerra	February 24, 2010 (age 16)	1.77 m (5 ft 10 in)	VNS Savouge Baby Griffins
S	Raine Christian Mhel Mariano	January 29, 2007 (age 19)	1.78 m (5 ft 10 in)	Umingan National High School V.C.
L	John Lan Juris Guevarra	November 3, 2007 (age 18)	1.65 m (5 ft 5 in)	Adamson Baby Falcons

The following persons were assigned by the Philippine National Volleyball Federation as part of the coaching staff.

Coaching Staff
Position	Name
Head coach	(Brazil) Sergio Valadares Veloso
Assistant coach 1	(Philippines) Ralph Ocampo
Assistant coach 2	(Philippines) Melchiazedek Samonte
Trainer	(Philippines) Eusebio Solis
Statistician	(Philippines) Mark Gil Alfafara
Team manager	(Philippines) Cherry Rose Macatangay

=== Starting Rotation ===
Philippine Men's National U19 Volleyball Team

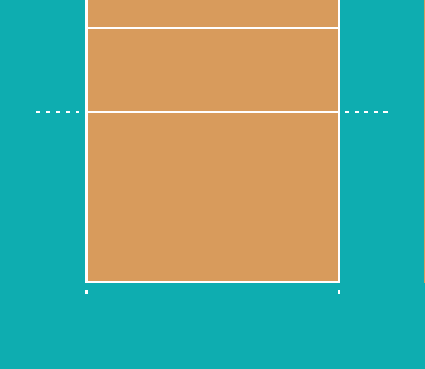

== Competition record ==
=== Men's Asian U18 Volleyball Championship ===
Asian U18 Championship record
Year	Round	Position	Pld	W	L	SW	SL	Squad
(Philippines) 1997	Classification Round	8th place	5	0	5	No info		
(Taiwan) 1999	Classification Round	8th place	5	0	5	1	15	No info
(Iran) 2001	Did not participate							
(India) 2003	Did not participate							
(Iran) 2005	Did not participate							
(Malaysia) 2007	Did not participate							
(Sri Lanka) 2008	Did not participate							
(Iran) 2010	Did not participate							
(Iran) 2012	Did not participate							
(Sri Lanka) 2014	Did not participate							
(Myanmar) 2017	Did not participate							
(Iran) 2018	Did not participate							
(Iran) 2020	Did not participate							
(Iran) 2022	Did not participate							
(Bahrain) 2024	Classification Round	11th place	7	3	4	12	14	–
Total	0 Title(s)		17	3	14			—

== Coaches ==
- (Brazil) Sérgio Veloso (2024–present)

== See also ==
- Men's
  - Philippines men's national volleyball team
  - Philippines men's national under-23 volleyball team
  - Philippines men's national beach volleyball team
- Women's
  - Philippines women's national volleyball team
  - Philippines women's national under-23 volleyball team
  - Philippines women's national under-21 volleyball team
  - Philippines women's national under-19 volleyball team
  - Philippines women's national under-17 volleyball team
  - Philippines women's national beach volleyball team
- Volleyball in the Philippines
