= India men's national under-19 volleyball team =

India Under-19
- Association: Volleyball Federation of India
- Confederation: AVC

Uniforms
Home

FIVB U19 World Championship
- Appearances: 6 (First in 2003)
- Best result: (silver) Runners–up (2003)

AVC U19 Asian Championship
- Appearances: 12 (First in 2001)
- Best result: (gold) Champions (2003)

The India men's national under-19 volleyball team represents India in men's under-19 volleyball events. It is controlled and managed by the Volleyball Federation of India (VFI), which is a member of the Asian volleyball body Asian Volleyball Confederation (AVC) and the international volleyball body government the Fédération Internationale de Volleyball (FIVB).

== Tournament record ==
World Championship
Year	Host	Position
2003	Thailand	2nd
2005	Algeria	9th
2007	Mexico	8th
2009	Italy	7th
2021	Iran	10th
2023	Argentina	17th

Asian Championship
Year	Host	Position
2001	Iran	7th
2003	India	1st
2005	Iran	3rd
2007	Malaysia	2nd
2008	Sri Lanka	3rd
2010	Iran	4th
2012	Iran	7th
2014	Sri Lanka	7th
2018	Iran	7th
2022	Iran	3rd
2024	Bahrain	9th
2026	China	8th
