= AVC Boys' U18 Volleyball Championship =

Continental under-18 volleyball championship

- Most recent season or competition: 2026 AVC Boys' U18 Volleyball Championship
- Formerly: Asian Youth Men's Volleyball Championship (1997–2001); Asian Youth Boys' Volleyball Championship (2003–2012); Asian Boys' U18 Volleyball Championship (2014); Asian Boys' U19 Volleyball Championship (2017); Asian Men's U18 Volleyball Championship (2018–2024)
- Sport: Volleyball
- Founded: 1997; 29 years ago
- First season: 1997
- No. of teams: 16
- Continents: Asia and Oceania (AVC)
- Most recent champions: Iran (8th title)
- Most titles: Iran (8 titles)

The AVC Boys' U18 Volleyball Championship is an international volleyball competition in Asia and Oceania contested by the under-18 men's national teams of the members of Asian Volleyball Confederation (AVC). First held in 1997, the tournament is held biennially and serves as a qualification tournament for the FIVB Volleyball Boys' U19 World Championship.

It broke its biennial design only in 2008, a year after it held its 2007 competition in Colombo, and in 2018, following the holding of a competition in 2017 in Naypyidaw after the tournament skipped the year 2016. It formerly carried the title Asian Boys' U19 Volleyball Championship (in the tournament's 11th edition), Asian Boys' U18 Volleyball Championship (in the 10th edition), Asian Youth Boys' Volleyball Championship (in the 4th-9th editions), and Asian Youth Men's Volleyball Championship (in the 1st, 2nd and 3rd editions).

15 of the championship's tournaments have been won by six different national teams. Iran have won eight times and Japan have won three times. The other winners are China, Chinese Taipei, South Korea and India with one title each.

== Result summary ==
Year	Host	Final			3rd place match			Teams
Year	Host	Champions	Score	Runners-up	3rd place	Score	4th place	Teams
1997; Details	(Philippines); Baguio	Chinese Taipei	Round-robin	South Korea	Japan	Round-robin	China	8
1999; Details	(Taiwan); Chiayi	South Korea	Round-robin	Japan	China	Round-robin	Saudi Arabia	8
2001; Details	(Iran); Isfahan	Iran	3–1	South Korea	Chinese Taipei	3–2	North Korea	10
2003; Details	(India); Visakhapatnam	India	3–1	Iran	North Korea	3–0	China	9
2005; Details	(Iran); Tehran	Iran	3–0	South Korea	India	3–0	Chinese Taipei	8
2007; Details	(Malaysia); Kuala Lumpur	Iran	3–0	India	China	3–2	South Korea	11
2008; Details	(Sri Lanka); Colombo	Iran	3–0	Japan	India	3–2	China	11
2010; Details	(Iran); Tehran	Iran	3–2	China	South Korea	3–1	India	10
2012; Details	(Iran); Tehran	Iran	3–2	China	Japan	3–2	South Korea	11
2014; Details	(Sri Lanka); Colombo	Iran	3–0	Japan	China	3–1	Chinese Taipei	15
2017; Details	(Myanmar); Naypyidaw	Japan	3–0	South Korea	China	3–1	Iran	11
2018; Details	(Iran); Tabriz	Japan	3–1	South Korea	Iran	3–1	Chinese Taipei	17
2020; Details	(Iran); Shiraz	Canceled due to COVID-19 pandemic						
2022; Details	(Iran); Tehran	Japan	3–0	Iran	India	3–2	South Korea	8
2024; Details	(Bahrain); Manama	China	3–2	Iran	Pakistan	3–0	Japan	16
2026; Details	(China); Haikou	Iran	3–1	Japan	Chinese Taipei	3–2	China	16

=== Teams reaching the top four ===
Team	Winners	Runners-up	Third-place	Fourth-place
Iran	8 (2001, 2005, 2007, 2008, 2010, 2012, 2014, 2026)	3 (2003, 2022, 2024)	1 (2018)	1 (2017)
Japan	3 (2017, 2018, 2022)	4 (1999, 2008, 2014, 2026)	2 (1997, 2012)	1 (2024)
South Korea	1 (1999)	5 (1997, 2001, 2005, 2017, 2018)	1 (2010)	3 (2007, 2012, 2022)
China	1 (2024)	2 (2010, 2012)	4 (1999, 2007, 2014, 2017)	4 (1997, 2003, 2008, 2026)
India	1 (2003)	1 (2007)	3 (2005, 2008, 2022)	1 (2010)
Chinese Taipei	1 (1997)		2 (2001, 2026)	3 (2005, 2014, 2018)
North Korea			1 (2003)	1 (2001)
Pakistan			1 (2024)	
Saudi Arabia				1 (1999)

=== Champions by region ===
Federation (Region)	Champion(s)	Number
CAZVA (Central Asia)	Iran (8), India (1)	9 titles
EAZVA (East Asia)	Japan (3), China (1), Chinese Taipei (1), South Korea (1)	6 titles

== Hosts ==
Number	Nations	Year(s)
6	Iran	2001, 2005, 2010, 2012, 2018, ~~2020~~, 2022
2	Sri Lanka	2008, 2014
1	Bahrain	2024
1	China	2026
1	Taiwan	1999
1	India	2003
1	Malaysia	2007
1	Myanmar	2017
1	Philippines	1997

== Medal table ==
Rank	Nation	Gold	Silver	Bronze	Total
1	Iran	8	3	1	12
2	Japan	3	4	2	9
3	South Korea	1	5	1	7
4	China	1	2	4	7
5	India	1	1	3	5
6	Chinese Taipei	1	0	2	3
7	North Korea	0	0	1	1
7	Pakistan	0	0	1	1
Totals (8 entries)		15	15	15	45

== Participating nations ==
Legend

- 1st – Champions
- 2nd – Runners-up
- 3rd – Third place
- 4th – Fourth place
- • – Did not enter / Did not qualify
- – Hosts
- Q – Qualified for the forthcoming tournament

Year Team	(Philippines) 1997 (8)	(Taiwan) 1999 (8)	(Iran) 2001 (10)	(India) 2003 (9)	(Iran) 2005 (8)	(Malaysia) 2007 (11)	(Sri Lanka) 2008 (11)	(Iran) 2010 (10)	(Iran) 2012 (11)	(Sri Lanka) 2014 (15)	(Myanmar) 2017 (11)	(Iran) 2018 (17)	(Iran) 2022 (8)	(Bahrain) 2024 (16)	(China) 2026 (16)	Total
Australia	6th	7th	10th	6th	8th	7th	8th	9th	9th	8th	7th	8th	•	12th	16th	14
Bahrain	•	•	•	•	•	•	•	•	•	9th	•	•	•	7th	12th	3
Bangladesh	•	•	•	•	•	•	•	•	•	•	10th	•	•	•	•	1
China	4th	3rd	5th	4th	6th	3rd	4th	2nd	2nd	3rd	3rd	6th	5th	1st	4th	15
Chinese Taipei	1st	5th	3rd	8th	4th	6th	5th	6th	5th	4th	5th	4th	6th	8th	3rd	15
Hong Kong	•	•	•	•	•	11th	•	•	•	13th	11th	17th	•	13th	11th	6
India	•	•	7th	1st	3rd	2nd	3rd	4th	7th	7th	•	7th	3rd	9th	8th	12
Indonesia	•	•	•	•	•	•	•	•	•	•	•	•	•	•	9th	1
Iran	•	•	1st	2nd	1st	1st	1st	1st	1st	1st	4th	3rd	2nd	2nd	1st	13
Japan	3rd	2nd	6th	•	5th	5th	2nd	5th	3rd	2nd	1st	1st	1st	4th	2nd	14
Kazakhstan	•	•	•	•	•	•	9th	10th	10th	9th	•	12th	•	10th	14th	7
Kuwait	•	•	•	•	•	•	10th	•	•	•	•	•	8th	16th	•	3
Kyrgyzstan	•	•	•	•	•	•	•	•	•	•	•	•	•	•	13th	1
Lebanon	•	•	•	•	•	•	•	•	•	•	•	•	•	14th	•	1
Malaysia	•	•	•	•	•	8th	•	•	•	•	•	10th	•	•	•	2
Maldives	•	•	•	•	•	•	11th	•	•	14th	•	•	•	•	•	2
Myanmar	•	•	•	•	•	•	•	•	•	•	8th	•	•	•	•	1
New Zealand	•	•	•	•	•	•	•	•	•	•	•	14th	•	•	•	1
North Korea	•	•	4th	3rd	•	•	•	•	•	•	•	•	•	•	•	2
Oman	•	•	•	•	•	•	•	•	•	•	•	13th	•	•	•	1
Pakistan	•	•	•	•	•	•	•	•	•	•	•	11th	•	3rd	5th	3
Philippines	8th	8th	•	•	•	•	•	•	•	•	•	•	•	11th	10th	4
Qatar	•	•	8th	7th	•	•	•	•	•	15th	•	16th	•	•	•	4
Saudi Arabia	•	4th	9th	•	•	•	•	•	•	11th	•	•	•	15th	15th	5
South Korea	2nd	1st	2nd	9th	2nd	4th	•	3rd	4th	6th	2nd	2nd	4th	5th	7th	14
Sri Lanka	•	•	•	•	•	10th	7th	8th	6th	5th	9th	9th	•	•	•	7
Thailand	5th	6th	•	5th	7th	9th	6th	7th	8th	•	6th	5th	7th	6th	6th	13
Turkmenistan	•	•	•	•	•	•	•	•	11th	12th	•	15th	•	•	•	3
United Arab Emirates	7th	•	•	•	•	•	•	•	•	•	•	•	•	•	•	1

=== Debut of teams ===
Year	Debutants	Total
1997	Australia	8
1997	China	8
1997	Chinese Taipei	8
1997	Japan	8
1997	Philippines	8
1997	South Korea	8
1997	Thailand	8
1997	United Arab Emirates	8
1999	Saudi Arabia	1
2001	India	4
2001	Iran	4
2001	North Korea	4
2001	Qatar	4
2003	None	0
2005	None	0
2007	Hong Kong	3
2007	Malaysia	3
2007	Sri Lanka	3
2008	Kazakhstan	3
2008	Kuwait	3
2008	Maldives	3
2010	None	0
2012	Turkmenistan	1
2014	Bahrain	1
2017	Bangladesh	2
2017	Myanmar	2
2018	New Zealand	3
2018	Oman	3
2018	Pakistan	3
2022	None	0
2024	Lebanon	1
2026	Indonesia	2
2026	Kyrgyzstan	2

== Awards ==
=== Most Valuable Player ===
Tournament	Most Valuable Player
2001 Isfahan	(Iran) Mohammad Soleimani
2003 Visakhapatnam	(India) Sanjay Kumar
2005 Tehran	(Iran) Saber Narimannejad
2007 Kuala Lumpur	(Iran) Mojtaba Shaban
2008 Colombo	(Iran) Farhad Salafzoun
2010 Tehran	(Iran) Ramin Khani
2012 Tehran	(Iran) Akbar Valaei
2014 Colombo	(Iran) Rasoul Aghchehli
2017 Naypyidaw	(Japan) Kento Miyaura
2018 Tabriz	(Japan) Taito Mizumachi
2022 Tehran	(Japan) Hiroki Bito
2024 Manama	(China) Ding Haocheng

=== Best Outside Spikers ===
Tournament	Best Opposite Spiker
2014 Colombo	(Iran) Amir Hossein Esfandiar
2014 Colombo	(Chinese Taipei) Jan Min-han
2017 Naypyidaw	(Iran) Morteza Sharifi
2017 Naypyidaw	(Japan) Mahiro Saeki
2018 Tabriz	(Chinese Taipei) Chang Hung-yeh
2018 Tabriz	(South Korea) Park Seung-su
2022 Tehran	(Japan) Shunta Ono
2022 Tehran	(Iran) S.Matin Hosseini
2024 Manama	(China) Yu Xiang
2024 Manama	(Iran) Rahimi Mohammad Amin

=== Best Opposite Spiker ===
Tournament	Best Opposite Spiker
2014 Colombo	(Iran) Rasoul Aghchehli
2017 Naypyidaw	(South Korea) Im Dong-hyeok
2018 Tabriz	(Iran) Bardia Saadat
2022 Tehran	(India) Aryan Baliyan
2024 Manama	(Pakistan) Yahya Muhhamad

=== Best Setter ===
Tournament	Best Setter
2001 Isfahan	(South Korea) Song Byung-il
2003 Visakhapatnam	(India) Ramaswami Kamraj
2005 Tehran	(South Korea) Kim Gwang-guk
2007 Kuala Lumpur	(Chinese Taipei) Cheng Li-sheng
2008 Colombo	(Japan) Kosuke Tomonaga
2010 Tehran	(South Korea) Lee Min-gyu
2012 Tehran	(China) Yu Yaochen
2014 Colombo	(Iran) Javad Karimi
2017 Naypyidaw	(South Korea) Choi Ik-je
2018 Tabriz	(Japan) Taiga Itoyama
2022 Tehran	(Iran) Emran Kook Jili
2024 Manama	(China) Gong Haoqian

=== Best Middle Blockers ===
Tournament	Best Middle Blockers
2014 Colombo	(Iran) Ali Asghar Mojarad
2014 Colombo	(China) Tao Zixuan
2017 Naypyidaw	(China) Wang Dongchen
2017 Naypyidaw	(Japan) Shunichiro Sato
2018 Tabriz	(Iran) Alireza Abdollahi
2018 Tabriz	(Japan) Riku Ito
2022 Tehran	(Iran) Taha Behboudnia
2022 Tehran	(India) Kush Singh
2024 Manama	(Iran) Bateni Mohammadnima
2024 Manama	(Pakistan) Jabran Jabran

=== Best Libero ===
Tournament	Best Libero
2005 Tehran	(Iran) Abdolreza Alizadeh
2008 Colombo	(Japan) Taiki Tsuruda
2010 Tehran	(South Korea) Oh Jae-seong
2012 Tehran	(South Korea) Lee Sang-uk
2014 Colombo	(Japan) Tomohiro Horie
2017 Naypyidaw	(South Korea) Park Kyeong-min
2018 Tabriz	(South Korea) Jang Ji-won
2022 Tehran	(Japan) Sena Kameoka
2024 Manama	(Iran) Arabyarmohammadi Mohammadamin

== Former awards ==
=== Best Scorer ===
Tournament	Best Scorer
2001 Isfahan	(South Korea) Kang Dong-jin
2003 Visakhapatnam	(Iran) Mohammad Soleimani
2005 Tehran	(Iran) Mansour Zadvan
2007 Kuala Lumpur	(Iran) Mojtaba Shaban
2008 Colombo	(Iran) Pouria Fayazi
2010 Tehran	(India) Anup D'Costa
2012 Tehran	(Japan) Yuki Ishikawa

=== Best Spiker ===
Tournament	Best Spiker
2001 Isfahan	(Iran) Mohammad Soleimani
2003 Visakhapatnam	(North Korea) Pak Yong-nam
2005 Tehran	(South Korea) Kang Young-jun
2007 Kuala Lumpur	(China) Chen Ping
2008 Colombo	(China) Dai Qingyao
2010 Tehran	(South Korea) Jin Seong-tae
2012 Tehran	(China) Zhang Zhejia

=== Best Server ===
Tournament	Best Server
2001 Isfahan	(South Korea) Kang Dong-jin
2003 Visakhapatnam	(Iran) Arash Sadeghiani
2005 Tehran	(Iran) Arash Keshavarzi
2007 Kuala Lumpur	(China) Chen Ping
2008 Colombo	(China) Song Jianwei
2010 Tehran	(China) Song Jianwei
2012 Tehran	(Iran) Javad Hekmati

=== Best Blocker ===
Tournament	Best Blocker
2001 Isfahan	(Iran) Davoud Moghbeli
2003 Visakhapatnam	(India) Sanjay Kumar
2005 Tehran	(India) Guttikonda Pradeep
2007 Kuala Lumpur	(Australia) Aidan Zingel
2008 Colombo	(Iran) Saman Faezi
2010 Tehran	(Iran) Armin Sadeghiani
2012 Tehran	(Iran) Sahand Allahverdian

=== Best Receiver ===
Tournament	Best Receiver
2001 Isfahan	(Chinese Taipei) Liu Hsiung
2003 Visakhapatnam	(India) P. S. Srikanth
2007 Kuala Lumpur	(Chinese Taipei) Chien Wei-lun

=== Best Digger ===
Tournament	Best Digger
2001 Isfahan	(Iran) Farhad Zarif
2003 Visakhapatnam	(Iran) Moslem Mohammadizadeh
2007 Kuala Lumpur	(Japan) Shogo Hayase

== See also ==
- AVC Girls' U18 Volleyball Championship
- AVC Men's Volleyball Continental Championship
- AVC Men's Volleyball Cup
- AVC Men's U20 Volleyball Championship
- AVC Boys' U16 Volleyball Championship
