= 2018 Asian Men's U18 Volleyball Championship =

Tournament details
- Host country: Iran
- City: Tabriz
- Dates: 29 June – 6 July
- Teams: 17 (from 1 confederation)
- Venue: 2 (in 1 host city)

Final positions
- Champions: Japan (2nd title)
- Runners-up: South Korea
- Third place: Iran
- Fourth place: Chinese Taipei

Tournament awards
- MVP: (Japan) Taito Mizumachi
- Best Setter: (Japan) Taiga Itoyama
- Best OH: (Chinese Taipei) Chang Hung-yeh (South Korea) Park Seung-su
- Best MB: (Iran) Alireza Abdollahi (Japan) Riku Ito
- Best OPP: (Iran) Bardia Saadat
- Best Libero: (South Korea) Jang Ji-won

The 2018 Asian Men's U18 Volleyball Championship was the 12th edition of the Asian Men's U18 Volleyball Championship, a biennial international volleyball tournament organised by the Asian Volleyball Confederation (AVC), that year with the Islamic Republic of Iran Volleyball Federation (IRIVF). The tournament was held in Tabriz, Iran from 29 June to 6 July 2018. The top four teams of the tournament qualified for the 2019 FIVB Volleyball Boys' U19 World Championship as AVC's representatives.

To participate, players must have been born on or after 1 January 2001, and they could only enroll for a maximum of one championship.

On 14 December 2020, the AVC announced that the 2020 Men's Asian U18 Volleyball Championship, which was originally the AVC qualifier for the 2021 FIVB Volleyball Boys' U19 World Championship, was canceled due to the COVID-19 pandemic, and that the top four teams of the 2018 tournament that had not yet qualified to the 2021 U19 World Championship would now be qualified for the same Championship as AVC's representatives.

== Qualification ==
The 18 AVC member associations submitted their U18 men's national teams to the Championship; however, Uzbekistan later withdrew. The 17 AVC member associations were from 5 zonal associations, including, Central Asia (6 teams), East Asia (5 teams), Oceania (2 teams), Southeast Asia (2 teams) and West Asia (2 teams).

=== Qualified teams ===
The following teams qualified for the tournament.

| Means of qualification | Berths | Qualified |
|---|---|---|
| Host Country | 1 | Iran |
| Central Asian teams | 5 | India |
| Central Asian teams | 5 | Kazakhstan |
| Central Asian teams | 5 | Pakistan |
| Central Asian teams | 5 | Sri Lanka |
| Central Asian teams | 5 | Turkmenistan |
| Central Asian teams | 5 | ~~Uzbekistan~~ |
| East Asian teams | 5 | China |
| East Asian teams | 5 | Chinese Taipei |
| East Asian teams | 5 | Hong Kong |
| East Asian teams | 5 | Japan |
| East Asian teams | 5 | South Korea |
| Oceanian teams | 2 | Australia |
| Oceanian teams | 2 | New Zealand |
| Southeast Asian teams | 2 | Malaysia |
| Southeast Asian teams | 2 | Thailand |
| West Asian teams | 2 | Oman |
| West Asian teams | 2 | Qatar |
Total 17

== Pools composition ==
This was the first Asian U18 Championship to use the new competition format. Following the 2017 AVC Board of Administration's unanimous decision, the new format saw teams drawn into six pools up to the total amount of the participating teams. Each team, including the hosts, was assigned into a pool according to their final standing in the 2017 edition. As the three best ranked teams were drawn in the same pool A, the next best three contested pool B, and the next best three contested pool C. Uzbekistan withdrew after the draw. The teams' final standing in the 2017 edition are shown in brackets.

| Pool A | Pool B | Pool C | Pool D | Pool E | Pool F |
|---|---|---|---|---|---|
| Japan (1) | Iran (Hosts) | Australia (7) | Oman | New Zealand | Qatar |
| South Korea (2) | Chinese Taipei (5) | Sri Lanka (9) | India | Pakistan | Malaysia |
| China (3) | Thailand (6) | Hong Kong (11) | Kazakhstan | ~~Uzbekistan~~ | Turkmenistan |

== Venues ==
- Shahid Poursharifi Arena, Tabriz, Iran
- Shahid Aghdami Arena, Tabriz, Iran

== Pool standing procedure ==
1. Number of matches won
2. Match points
3. Sets ratio
4. Points ratio
5. If the tie continues as per the point ratio between two teams, the priority will be given to the team which won the last match between them. When the tie in points ratio is between three or more teams, a new classification of these teams in the terms of points 1, 2 and 3 will be made taking into consideration only the matches in which they were opposed to each other.

Match won 3–0 or 3–1: 3 match points for the winner, 0 match points for the loser
Match won 3–2: 2 match points for the winner, 1 match point for the loser

== Preliminary round ==
- All times are Iran Daylight Time (UTC+04:30).
- Originally, the winners of pool D had to play against the third-ranked team of pool E in the playoffs. However, due to the absence of Uzbekistan, there were only two teams in pool E, so the winners of pool D went directly to the round of 12.

=== Pool A ===
| Pos | Team | Pld | W | L | Pts | SW | SL | SR | SPW | SPL | SPR | Qualification |
|---|---|---|---|---|---|---|---|---|---|---|---|---|
| 1 | South Korea | 2 | 2 | 0 | 6 | 6 | 1 | 6.000 | 172 | 145 | 1.186 | Round of 12 |
| 2 | Japan | 2 | 1 | 1 | 3 | 4 | 3 | 1.333 | 167 | 156 | 1.071 | Round of 12 |
| 3 | China | 2 | 0 | 2 | 0 | 0 | 6 | 0.000 | 112 | 150 | 0.747 | Round of 12 |

| Date | Time | Venue | | Score | | Set 1 | Set 2 | Set 3 | Set 4 | Set 5 | Total | Report |
|---|---|---|---|---|---|---|---|---|---|---|---|---|
| 29 Jun | 16:00 | SPA | Japan | 3–0 | China | 25–19 | 25–22 | 25–18 | | | 75–59 | P2 |
| 30 Jun | 13:30 | SPA | South Korea | 3–1 | Japan | 26–24 | 21–25 | 25–23 | 25–20 | | 97–92 | P2 |
| 1 Jul | 18:30 | SPA | China | 0–3 | South Korea | 21–25 | 15–25 | 17–25 | | | 53–75 | P2 |

=== Pool B ===
| Pos | Team | Pld | W | L | Pts | SW | SL | SR | SPW | SPL | SPR | Qualification |
|---|---|---|---|---|---|---|---|---|---|---|---|---|
| 1 | Thailand | 2 | 1 | 1 | 3 | 4 | 3 | 1.333 | 158 | 162 | 0.975 | Round of 12 |
| 2 | Chinese Taipei | 2 | 1 | 1 | 3 | 3 | 3 | 1.000 | 140 | 137 | 1.022 | Round of 12 |
| 3 | Iran | 2 | 1 | 1 | 3 | 3 | 4 | 0.750 | 159 | 158 | 1.006 | Round of 12 |

| Date | Time | Venue | | Score | | Set 1 | Set 2 | Set 3 | Set 4 | Set 5 | Total | Report |
|---|---|---|---|---|---|---|---|---|---|---|---|---|
| 29 Jun | 18:30 | SPA | Iran | 3–1 | Thailand | 25–19 | 25–20 | 22–25 | 25–19 | | 97–83 | P2 |
| 30 Jun | 18:30 | SPA | Chinese Taipei | 3–0 | Iran | 25–20 | 25–23 | 25–19 | | | 75–62 | P2 |
| 1 Jul | 13:30 | SPA | Thailand | 3–0 | Chinese Taipei | 25–23 | 25–21 | 25–21 | | | 75–65 | P2 |

=== Pool C ===
| Pos | Team | Pld | W | L | Pts | SW | SL | SR | SPW | SPL | SPR | Qualification |
|---|---|---|---|---|---|---|---|---|---|---|---|---|
| 1 | Sri Lanka | 2 | 2 | 0 | 6 | 6 | 1 | 6.000 | 173 | 139 | 1.245 | Playoffs |
| 2 | Australia | 2 | 1 | 1 | 3 | 3 | 4 | 0.750 | 160 | 159 | 1.006 | Playoffs |
| 3 | Hong Kong | 2 | 0 | 2 | 0 | 2 | 6 | 0.333 | 157 | 192 | 0.818 | Playoffs |

| Date | Time | Venue | | Score | | Set 1 | Set 2 | Set 3 | Set 4 | Set 5 | Total | Report |
|---|---|---|---|---|---|---|---|---|---|---|---|---|
| 29 Jun | 13:30 | SPA | Hong Kong | 1–3 | Australia | 19–25 | 25–20 | 18–25 | 21–25 | | 83–95 | P2 |
| 30 Jun | 13:30 | SAA | Sri Lanka | 3–1 | Hong Kong | 25–17 | 25–14 | 22–25 | 25–18 | | 97–74 | P2 |
| 1 Jul | 16:00 | SAA | Australia | 0–3 | Sri Lanka | 20–25 | 21–25 | 24–26 | | | 65–76 | P2 |

=== Pool D ===
| Pos | Team | Pld | W | L | Pts | SW | SL | SR | SPW | SPL | SPR | Qualification |
|---|---|---|---|---|---|---|---|---|---|---|---|---|
| 1 | India | 2 | 2 | 0 | 6 | 6 | 1 | 6.000 | 171 | 140 | 1.221 | Round of 12 |
| 2 | Kazakhstan | 2 | 1 | 1 | 3 | 3 | 3 | 1.000 | 151 | 151 | 1.000 | Playoffs |
| 3 | Oman | 2 | 0 | 2 | 0 | 1 | 6 | 0.167 | 151 | 182 | 0.830 | Playoffs |

| Date | Time | Venue | | Score | | Set 1 | Set 2 | Set 3 | Set 4 | Set 5 | Total | Report |
|---|---|---|---|---|---|---|---|---|---|---|---|---|
| 29 Jun | 13:30 | SAA | India | 3–1 | Oman | 25–16 | 25–18 | 21–25 | 25–16 | | 96–75 | P2 |
| 30 Jun | 16:00 | SAA | Kazakhstan | 0–3 | India | 21–25 | 23–25 | 21–25 | | | 65–75 | P2 |
| 1 Jul | 13:30 | SAA | Oman | 0–3 | Kazakhstan | 23–25 | 34–36 | 19–25 | | | 76–86 | P2 |

=== Pool E ===
| Pos | Team | Pld | W | L | Pts | SW | SL | SR | SPW | SPL | SPR | Qualification |
|---|---|---|---|---|---|---|---|---|---|---|---|---|
| 1 | Pakistan | 1 | 1 | 0 | 3 | 3 | 0 | MAX | 75 | 44 | 1.705 | Playoffs |
| 2 | New Zealand | 1 | 0 | 1 | 0 | 0 | 3 | 0.000 | 44 | 75 | 0.587 | Playoffs |

| Date | Time | Venue | | Score | | Set 1 | Set 2 | Set 3 | Set 4 | Set 5 | Total | Report |
|---|---|---|---|---|---|---|---|---|---|---|---|---|
| 29 Jun | 16:00 | SAA | New Zealand | 0–3 | Pakistan | 18–25 | 12–25 | 14–25 | | | 44–75 | P2 |

=== Pool F ===
| Pos | Team | Pld | W | L | Pts | SW | SL | SR | SPW | SPL | SPR | Qualification |
|---|---|---|---|---|---|---|---|---|---|---|---|---|
| 1 | Malaysia | 2 | 2 | 0 | 6 | 6 | 0 | MAX | 153 | 93 | 1.645 | Playoffs |
| 2 | Turkmenistan | 2 | 1 | 1 | 3 | 3 | 3 | 1.000 | 130 | 127 | 1.024 | Playoffs |
| 3 | Qatar | 2 | 0 | 2 | 0 | 0 | 6 | 0.000 | 87 | 150 | 0.580 | Playoffs |

| Date | Time | Venue | | Score | | Set 1 | Set 2 | Set 3 | Set 4 | Set 5 | Total | Report |
|---|---|---|---|---|---|---|---|---|---|---|---|---|
| 29 Jun | 18:30 | SAA | Malaysia | 3–0 | Turkmenistan | 25–18 | 25–11 | 28–26 | | | 78–55 | P2 |
| 30 Jun | 16:00 | SPA | Qatar | 0–3 | Malaysia | 10–25 | 18–25 | 10–25 | | | 38–75 | P2 |
| 1 Jul | 16:00 | SPA | Turkmenistan | 3–0 | Qatar | 25–13 | 25–22 | 25–14 | | | 75–49 | P2 |

== Final round ==
- All times are Iran Daylight Time (UTC+04:30).

Playoffs
2 July
Oman | 1
Pakistan | 3
2 July
Hong Kong | 2
Malaysia | 3
2 July
Australia | 3
Turkmenistan | 0
2 July
Kazakhstan | 3
New Zealand | 0
2 July
Sri Lanka | 3
Qatar | 0

Round of 12
3 July
South Korea | 3
Pakistan | 0
3 July
Thailand | 3
Malaysia | 0
3 July
Chinese Taipei | 3
Australia | 0
3 July
Japan | 3
Kazakhstan | 0
3 July
China | 2
India | 3
3 July
Iran | 3
Sri Lanka | 0

Quarterfinals
South Korea | Bye
4 July
Thailand | 0
Chinese Taipei | 3
Japan | Bye
4 July
India | 0
Iran | 3

Semifinals
5 July
South Korea | 3
Chinese Taipei | 0
5 July
Japan | 3
Iran | 1

Final
6 July
South Korea | 1
Japan | 3
3rd place match
6 July
Chinese Taipei | 1
Iran | 3

5th–10th quarterfinals
4 July
Malaysia | 2
Australia | 3
4 July
China | 3
Sri Lanka | 0

5th–8th semifinals
5 July
Thailand | 3
Australia | 0
5 July
India | 1
China | 3

5th place match
6 July
Thailand | 3
China | 2
7th place match
6 July
Australia | 0
India | 3

11th–14th semifinals
4 July
New Zealand | 1
Pakistan | 3
4 July
Oman | 1
Kazakhstan | 3

11th place match
5 July
Pakistan | 3
Kazakhstan | 1
13th place match
5 July
New Zealand | 1
Oman | 3

15th–17th semifinal
4 July
Turkmenistan | 3
Hong Kong | 2

15th place match
5 July
Qatar | 0
Turkmenistan | 3

=== Playoffs ===
| Date | Time | Venue | | Score | | Set 1 | Set 2 | Set 3 | Set 4 | Set 5 | Total | Report |
|---|---|---|---|---|---|---|---|---|---|---|---|---|
| 2 Jul | 13:30 | SPA | Australia | 3–0 | Turkmenistan | 25–16 | 30–28 | 25–21 | | | 80–65 | P2 |
| 2 Jul | 16:00 | SPA | Sri Lanka | 3–0 | Qatar | 25–10 | 25–23 | 25–13 | | | 75–46 | P2 |
| 2 Jul | 16:00 | SAA | Kazakhstan | 3–0 | New Zealand | 25–14 | 25–21 | 25–21 | | | 75–56 | P2 |
| 2 Jul | 18:30 | SPA | Hong Kong | 2–3 | Malaysia | 25–27 | 22–25 | 26–24 | 26–24 | 16–18 | 115–118 | P2 |
| 2 Jul | 18:30 | SAA | Oman | 1–3 | Pakistan | 17–25 | 28–26 | 10–25 | 15–25 | | 70–101 | P2 |

=== Round of 12 ===
| Date | Time | Venue | | Score | | Set 1 | Set 2 | Set 3 | Set 4 | Set 5 | Total | Report |
|---|---|---|---|---|---|---|---|---|---|---|---|---|
| 3 Jul | 13:30 | SPA | Thailand | 3–0 | Malaysia | 25–19 | 25–18 | 25–16 | | | 75–53 | P2 |
| 3 Jul | 13:30 | SAA | South Korea | 3–0 | Pakistan | 25–12 | 25–20 | 25–16 | | | 75–48 | P2 |
| 3 Jul | 16:00 | SPA | Japan | 3–0 | Kazakhstan | 25–12 | 25–18 | 25–23 | | | 75–53 | P2 |
| 3 Jul | 16:00 | SAA | Chinese Taipei | 3–0 | Australia | 25–20 | 25–20 | 27–25 | | | 77–65 | P2 |
| 3 Jul | 18:30 | SPA | Iran | 3–0 | Sri Lanka | 25–21 | 25–17 | 25–13 | | | 75–51 | P2 |
| 3 Jul | 18:30 | SAA | China | 2–3 | India | 25–23 | 18–25 | 25–18 | 19–25 | 11–15 | 98–106 | P2 |

=== 5th–10th quarterfinals ===
| Date | Time | Venue | | Score | | Set 1 | Set 2 | Set 3 | Set 4 | Set 5 | Total | Report |
|---|---|---|---|---|---|---|---|---|---|---|---|---|
| 4 Jul | 10:00 | SPA | Malaysia | 2–3 | Australia | 25–17 | 25–17 | 24–26 | 22–25 | 14–16 | 110–101 | P2 |
| 4 Jul | 16:00 | SPA | China | 3–0 | Sri Lanka | 25–22 | 25–18 | 25–19 | | | 75–59 | P2 |

=== Quarterfinals ===
| Date | Time | Venue | | Score | | Set 1 | Set 2 | Set 3 | Set 4 | Set 5 | Total | Report |
|---|---|---|---|---|---|---|---|---|---|---|---|---|
| 4 Jul | 13:30 | SPA | Thailand | 0–3 | Chinese Taipei | 24–26 | 24–26 | 20–25 | | | 68–77 | P2 |
| 4 Jul | 18:30 | SPA | India | 0–3 | Iran | 22–25 | 13–25 | 21–25 | | | 56–75 | P2 |

=== 15th–17th semifinal ===
| Date | Time | Venue | | Score | | Set 1 | Set 2 | Set 3 | Set 4 | Set 5 | Total | Report |
|---|---|---|---|---|---|---|---|---|---|---|---|---|
| 4 Jul | 13:30 | SAA | Turkmenistan | 3–2 | Hong Kong | 23–25 | 19–25 | 25–22 | 25–16 | 15–12 | 107–100 | P2 |

=== 11th–14th semifinals ===
| Date | Time | Venue | | Score | | Set 1 | Set 2 | Set 3 | Set 4 | Set 5 | Total | Report |
|---|---|---|---|---|---|---|---|---|---|---|---|---|
| 4 Jul | 16:15 | SAA | New Zealand | 1–3 | Pakistan | 18–25 | 20–25 | 31–29 | 17–25 | | 86–104 | P2 |
| 4 Jul | 18:45 | SAA | Oman | 1–3 | Kazakhstan | 20–25 | 25–22 | 18–25 | 14–25 | | 77–97 | P2 |

=== 5th–8th semifinals ===
| Date | Time | Venue | | Score | | Set 1 | Set 2 | Set 3 | Set 4 | Set 5 | Total | Report |
|---|---|---|---|---|---|---|---|---|---|---|---|---|
| 5 Jul | 10:00 | SPA | Thailand | 3–0 | Australia | 25–16 | 25–22 | 25–21 | | | 75–59 | P2 |
| 5 Jul | 13:30 | SPA | India | 1–3 | China | 26–24 | 22–25 | 17–25 | 20–25 | | 85–99 | P2 |

=== Semifinals ===
| Date | Time | Venue | | Score | | Set 1 | Set 2 | Set 3 | Set 4 | Set 5 | Total | Report |
|---|---|---|---|---|---|---|---|---|---|---|---|---|
| 5 Jul | 16:00 | SPA | South Korea | 3–0 | Chinese Taipei | 25–20 | 25–23 | 25–16 | | | 75–59 | P2 |
| 5 Jul | 18:30 | SPA | Japan | 3–1 | Iran | 25–20 | 25–22 | 25–27 | 25–16 | | 100–85 | P2 |

=== 15th place match ===
| Date | Time | Venue | | Score | | Set 1 | Set 2 | Set 3 | Set 4 | Set 5 | Total | Report |
|---|---|---|---|---|---|---|---|---|---|---|---|---|
| 5 Jul | 10:00 | SAA | Qatar | 0–3 | Turkmenistan | 17–25 | 11–25 | 20–25 | | | 48–75 | P2 |

=== 13th place match ===
| Date | Time | Venue | | Score | | Set 1 | Set 2 | Set 3 | Set 4 | Set 5 | Total | Report |
|---|---|---|---|---|---|---|---|---|---|---|---|---|
| 5 Jul | 13:30 | SAA | New Zealand | 1–3 | Oman | 19–25 | 25–22 | 19–25 | 21–25 | | 84–97 | P2 |

=== 11th place match ===
| Date | Time | Venue | | Score | | Set 1 | Set 2 | Set 3 | Set 4 | Set 5 | Total | Report |
|---|---|---|---|---|---|---|---|---|---|---|---|---|
| 5 Jul | 16:00 | SAA | Pakistan | 3–1 | Kazakhstan | 25–21 | 25–22 | 26–28 | 27–25 | | 103–96 | P2 |

=== 9th place match ===
| Date | Time | Venue | | Score | | Set 1 | Set 2 | Set 3 | Set 4 | Set 5 | Total | Report |
|---|---|---|---|---|---|---|---|---|---|---|---|---|
| 5 Jul | 18:35 | SAA | Sri Lanka | 3–1 | Malaysia | 25–22 | 25–14 | 24–26 | 25–23 | | 99–85 | P2 |

=== 7th place match ===
| Date | Time | Venue | | Score | | Set 1 | Set 2 | Set 3 | Set 4 | Set 5 | Total | Report |
|---|---|---|---|---|---|---|---|---|---|---|---|---|
| 6 Jul | 10:00 | SPA | Australia | 0–3 | India | 22–25 | 22–25 | 19–25 | | | 63–75 | P2 |

=== 5th place match ===
| Date | Time | Venue | | Score | | Set 1 | Set 2 | Set 3 | Set 4 | Set 5 | Total | Report |
|---|---|---|---|---|---|---|---|---|---|---|---|---|
| 6 Jul | 13:30 | SPA | Thailand | 3–2 | China | 22–25 | 25–17 | 19–25 | 25–23 | 16–14 | 107–104 | P2 |

=== 3rd place match ===
| Date | Time | Venue | | Score | | Set 1 | Set 2 | Set 3 | Set 4 | Set 5 | Total | Report |
|---|---|---|---|---|---|---|---|---|---|---|---|---|
| 6 Jul | 16:15 | SPA | Chinese Taipei | 1–3 | Iran | 23–25 | 25–21 | 16–25 | 20–25 | | 84–96 | P2 |

=== Final ===
| Date | Time | Venue | | Score | | Set 1 | Set 2 | Set 3 | Set 4 | Set 5 | Total | Report |
|---|---|---|---|---|---|---|---|---|---|---|---|---|
| 6 Jul | 18:30 | SPA | South Korea | 1–3 | Japan | 25–20 | 14–25 | 21–25 | 15–25 | | 75–95 | P2 |

== Final standing ==
| Rank | Team |
|---|---|
| 1st place, gold medalist(s) | Japan |
| 2nd place, silver medalist(s) | South Korea |
| 3rd place, bronze medalist(s) | Iran |
| 4 | Chinese Taipei |
| 5 | Thailand |
| 6 | China |
| 7 | India |
| 8 | Australia |
| 9 | Sri Lanka |
| 10 | Malaysia |
| 11 | Pakistan |
| 12 | Kazakhstan |
| 13 | Oman |
| 14 | New Zealand |
| 15 | Turkmenistan |
| 16 | Qatar |
| 17 | Hong Kong |

| Qualified for the 2019 and 2021 FIVB U19 World Championship |
| Qualified for the 2021 FIVB U19 World Championship |
| Qualified for the 2019 and already qualified as hosts for the 2021 FIVB U19 World Championship |

2018 Men's Asian U18 champions

Japan
2nd title

12–man roster
Mizumachi (c), Iwamoto, Yamada, Ito, Nakaya, Itoyama, Morii, Shigeto, Arao, Nishimura, Matsumoto, Yanakita
Head coach
Honda

== Awards ==
- Most valuable player
  (Japan) Taito Mizumachi
- Best setter
  (Japan) Taiga Itoyama
- Best outside spikers
  (Chinese Taipei) Chang Hung-yeh
  (South Korea) Park Seung-su
- Best middle blockers
  (Iran) Alireza Abdollahi
  (Japan) Riku Ito
- Best opposite spiker
  (Iran) Bardia Saadat
- Best libero
  (South Korea) Jang Ji-won

== See also ==
- 2018 Women's Asian U17 Volleyball Championship
