= 2024 Asian Men's U18 Volleyball Championship =

Volleyball competition held in Bahrain

Tournament details
- Host country: Bahrain
- City: Manama
- Dates: 28 July – 4 August
- Teams: 16 (from 1 confederation)
- Venue: 2 (in 1 host city)

Final positions
- Champions: China (1st title)
- Runners-up: Iran
- Third place: Pakistan
- Fourth place: Japan

Tournament awards
- MVP: (China) Ding Haocheng
- Best Setter: (China) Gong Haoqian
- Best OH: (China) Yu Xiang; (Iran) Rahimi Mohammad Amin
- Best MB: (Iran) Bateni Mohammadnima; (Pakistan) Jabran Jabran
- Best OPP: (Pakistan) Yahya Muhammad
- Best Libero: (Iran) Arabyarmohammadi Mohammadamin

Tournament statistics
- Matches played: 56
- Attendance: 13,271 (237 per match)

The 2024 Asian Men's U18 Volleyball Championship was the 15th edition of the Asian Men's U18 Volleybll Championship, a biennial international volleyball tournament organised by the Asian Volleyball Confederation (AVC) with Bahrain Volleyball Association (BVA). The tournament took place in Manama, Bahrain from 27 July to 4 August.

This tournament served as the qualification tournament for the FIVB Volleyball Boys' U19 World Championship. The top four teams of the tournament qualified for the 2025 FIVB Volleyball Boys' U19 World Championship as the AVC representatives.

Players must be born on or after January 1, 2007. Asia U18 players who have already played once in the FIVB U19 Championship cannot play in AVC U18 Championship as it is a qualification event for the following year of FIVB U19 event. In principle, the players can participate in Asian U18 and FIVB U19 only once.

China won their first title of the tournament after defeating Iran in a tiebreaker match (3–2) in the final. Pakistan defeated Japan in the third place match. Ding Haocheng of China named the MVP of the tournament.

== Host selection ==
AVC awarded Bahrain the hosting rights of the 15th edition of Asian Men's U18 Volleyball Championship, after they hosted the 2024 AVC Men's Challenge Cup.

== Qualification ==
The 16 AVC member associations submitted their U19 men's national team to the 2024 Asian U19 Championship. The 16 AVC member associations were from 5 zonal associations, including, Central Asia (4 teams), East Asia (5 teams), Oceania (1 teams), Southeast Asia (2 teams) and West Asia (4 teams).

=== Qualified teams ===
The following teams qualified for the tournament.

Means of qualification	Berths	Qualified
Host country	1	Bahrain
Central Asian teams	4	Pakistan
Central Asian teams	4	India
Central Asian teams	4	Iran
Central Asian teams	4	Kazakhstan
East Asian teams	5	China
East Asian teams	5	Chinese Taipei
East Asian teams	5	Japan
East Asian teams	5	South Korea
East Asian teams	5	Hong Kong
Oceanian teams	1	Australia
Southeast Asian teams	2	Thailand
Southeast Asian teams	2	Philippines
West Asian teams	3	Kuwait
West Asian teams	3	Lebanon
West Asian teams	3	Saudi Arabia
Total 16

== Pools composition ==
The overview of pools was released on 12 March 2024.

Pool A	Pool B	Pool C	Pool D
Bahrain (Hosts)	Japan (1)	Iran (2)	India (3)
Thailand (7)	Chinese Taipei (6)	China (5)	South Korea (4)
Hong Kong	Saudi Arabia	Lebanon	Kuwait (8)
Australia	Kazakhstan	Philippines	Pakistan

== Format ==
In preliminary round, all teams are divided into four pools (A, B, C, & D) with four teams each. The teams battled in a single round-robin with the top two teams in each pool qualified to 1st–8th classification while bottom two teams qualified to 9th–16th classification.

In classification round, all teams in each pools (E, F, G, & H) battle again in a single round-robin where top two teams in pools E and F qualify to semifinals and the two bottom teams qualify to 5th–8th places, while the top two teams in pools G and H qualify to 9th–12th places and 13th–16th places, respectively. Teams who faced each other in the preliminary will not play again rather their win-loss record will carry over.

In final round, the teams battle in knockout format.

== Venues ==
Preliminary, Classification, 1st–8th places	Preliminary, Classification, 9th–16th places
Manama, Bahrain
Isa Sport City Hall
Court 1	Court 2
Capacity: 5,000	Capacity: 5,000

== Pool standing procedure ==
1. Number of victories
2. Match points
3. Sets quotient
4. Points quotient
5. If the tie continues as per the point quotient between two teams, the priority will be given to the team which won the last match between them. When the tie in points ratio is between three or more teams, a new classification of these teams in the terms of points 1, 2 and 3 will be made taking into consideration only the matches in which they were opposed to each other.

Match won 3–0 or 3–1: 3 match points for the winner, 0 match points for the loser.
Match won 3–2: 2 match points for the winner, 1 match point for the loser.
Match forfeited: 0 point (25–0;25-0;25-0)

== Preliminary round ==
- All times are Bahrain Time (UTC+03:00).

=== Pool A ===
Pos	Team	Pld	W	L	Pts	SW	SL	SR	SPW	SPL	SPR	Qualification
1	Thailand	3	3	0	8	9	3	3.000	282	237	1.190	Pool E
2	Bahrain (H)	3	1	2	4	7	8	0.875	329	351	0.937	Pool E
3	Australia	3	1	2	4	6	7	0.857	307	300	1.023	Pool G
4	Hong Kong	3	1	2	2	4	8	0.500	281	279	1.007	Pool G

Source: Daily Bulletin No.4
(H) Host

Date	Time	Venue		Score		Set 1	Set 2	Set 3	Set 4	Set 5	Total	Report
28 Jul	16:30	Court 1	Australia	1–3	Thailand	25–21	18–25	13–25	21–25		77–96	Report
28 Jul	19:00	Court 1	Bahrain	2–3	Hong Kong	23–25	25–18	25–19	33–35	12–15	118–112	Report
29 Jul	16:30	Court 1	Hong Kong	1–3	Australia	19–25	24–26	25–23	26–28		94–102	Report
29 Jul	19:00	Court 1	Bahrain	2–3	Thailand	22–25	27–25	25–21	17–25	10–15	101–111	Report
30 Jul	16:30	Court 1	Thailand	3–0	Hong Kong	25–23	25–17	25–19			75–59	Report
30 Jul	19:00	Court 1	Bahrain	3–2	Australia	17–25	36–34	16–25	25–20	16–14	110–118	Report

=== Pool B ===
Pos	Team	Pld	W	L	Pts	SW	SL	SR	SPW	SPL	SPR	Qualification
1	Japan	3	3	0	9	9	1	9.000	251	191	1.314	Pool F
2	Chinese Taipei	3	2	1	5	6	5	1.200	234	239	0.979	Pool F
3	Kazakhstan	3	1	2	4	6	6	1.000	258	264	0.977	Pool H
4	Saudi Arabia	3	0	3	0	0	9	0.000	176	225	0.782	Pool H

Source: Daily Bulletin No.4

Date	Time	Venue		Score		Set 1	Set 2	Set 3	Set 4	Set 5	Total	Report
28 Jul	11:30	Court 1	Saudi Arabia	0–3	Chinese Taipei	18–25	23–25	22–25			63–75	Report
28 Jul	14:00	Court 1	Kazakhstan	1–3	Japan	27–25	19–25	12–25	24–26		82–101	Report
29 Jul	11:30	Court 1	Chinese Taipei	3–2	Kazakhstan	22–25	25–23	25–17	15–25	15–11	102–101	Report
29 Jul	14:00	Court 1	Saudi Arabia	0–3	Japan	20–25	18–25	14–25			52–75	Report
30 Jul	11:30	Court 1	Saudi Arabia	0–3	Kazakhstan	23–25	19–25	19–25			61–75	Report
30 Jul	14:00	Court 1	Japan	3–0	Chinese Taipei	25–21	25–16	25–20			75–57	Report

=== Pool C ===
Pos	Team	Pld	W	L	Pts	SW	SL	SR	SPW	SPL	SPR	Qualification
1	China	3	3	0	8	9	2	4.500	251	207	1.213	Pool E
2	Iran	3	2	1	7	8	3	2.667	260	199	1.307	Pool E
3	Philippines	3	1	2	3	3	6	0.500	184	209	0.880	Pool G
4	Lebanon	3	0	3	0	0	9	0.000	145	225	0.644	Pool G

Source: Daily Bulletin No.4

Date	Time	Venue		Score		Set 1	Set 2	Set 3	Set 4	Set 5	Total	Report
28 Jul	11:30	Court 2	Philippines	0–3	China	17–25	17–25	16–25			50–75	Report
28 Jul	14:00	Court 2	Lebanon	0–3	Iran	18–25	10–25	11–25			39–75	Report
29 Jul	11:30	Court 2	China	3–0	Lebanon	25–15	25–13	25–21			75–49	Report
29 Jul	14:00	Court 2	Philippines	0–3	Iran	14–25	20–25	25–27			59–77	Report
30 Jul	11:30	Court 2	Philippines	3–0	Lebanon	25–13	25–23	25–21			75–57	Report
30 Jul	14:00	Court 2	China	3–2	Iran	22–25	25–23	14–25	25–22	15–13	101–108	Report

=== Pool D ===
Pos	Team	Pld	W	L	Pts	SW	SL	SR	SPW	SPL	SPR	Qualification
1	Pakistan	3	3	0	8	9	2	4.500	261	214	1.220	Pool F
2	South Korea	3	2	1	7	8	3	2.667	253	208	1.216	Pool F
3	India	3	1	2	3	3	6	0.500	195	203	0.961	Pool H
4	Kuwait	3	0	3	0	0	9	0.000	141	225	0.627	Pool H

Source: Daily Bulletin No.4

Date	Time	Venue		Score		Set 1	Set 2	Set 3	Set 4	Set 5	Total	Report
28 Jul	16:30	Court 2	India	3–0	Kuwait	25–15	25–20	25–14			75–49	Report
28 Jul	19:00	Court 2	South Korea	2–3	Pakistan	25–22	23–25	17–25	25–20	13–15	103–107	Report
29 Jul	16:30	Court 2	India	0–3	Pakistan	20–25	27–29	15–25			62–79	Report
29 Jul	19:00	Court 2	Kuwait	0–3	South Korea	10–25	14–25	20–25			44–75	Report
30 Jul	16:30	Court 2	India	0–3	South Korea	18–25	23–25	17–25			58–75	Report
30 Jul	19:00	Court 2	Pakistan	3–0	Kuwait	25–19	25–11	25–19			75–49	Report

== Classification round ==
- All times are Bahrain Time (UTC+03:00).
- The results and the points of the matches between the same teams that were already played during the preliminary round shall be taken into account for the classification round.

=== Pool E ===
Pos	Team	Pld	W	L	Pts	SW	SL	SR	SPW	SPL	SPR	Qualification
1	China	3	3	0	8	9	2	4.500	251	201	1.249	Final four
2	Iran	3	2	1	7	8	3	2.667	258	208	1.240	Final four
3	Thailand	3	1	2	2	3	8	0.375	215	251	0.857	5th–8th places
4	Bahrain (H)	3	0	3	1	2	9	0.222	197	261	0.755	5th–8th places

Source: Daily Bulletin No.6
(H) Host

Date	Time	Venue		Score		Set 1	Set 2	Set 3	Set 4	Set 5	Total	Report
1 Aug	11:30	Court 1	Thailand	0–3	Iran	18–25	23–25	20–25			61–75	Report
1 Aug	19:00	Court 1	Bahrain	0–3	China	8–25	22–25	20–25			50–75	Report
2 Aug	14:00	Court 1	Thailand	0–3	China	10–25	13–25	20–25			43–75	Report
2 Aug	19:00	Court 1	Bahrain	0–3	Iran	12–25	20–25	14–25			46–75	Report

=== Pool F ===
Pos	Team	Pld	W	L	Pts	SW	SL	SR	SPW	SPL	SPR	Qualification
1	Japan	3	3	0	9	9	2	4.500	278	227	1.225	Final four
2	Pakistan	3	2	1	5	7	6	1.167	290	290	1.000	Final four
3	South Korea	3	1	2	4	6	6	1.000	264	265	0.996	5th–8th places
4	Chinese Taipei	3	0	3	0	1	9	0.111	199	249	0.799	5th–8th places

Source: Daily Bulletin No.6

Date	Time	Venue		Score		Set 1	Set 2	Set 3	Set 4	Set 5	Total	Report
1 Aug	14:00	Court 1	Chinese Taipei	1–3	Pakistan	20–25	26–24	18–25	23–25		87–99	Report
1 Aug	16:30	Court 1	Japan	3–1	South Korea	28–30	25–21	25–17	25–18		103–86	Report
2 Aug	11:30	Court 1	Japan	3–1	Pakistan	22–25	28–26	25–18	25–15		100–84	Report
2 Aug	16:30	Court 1	Chinese Taipei	0–3	South Korea	20–25	16–25	19–25			55–75	Report

=== Pool G ===
Pos	Team	Pld	W	L	Pts	SW	SL	SR	SPW	SPL	SPR	Qualification
1	Australia	3	3	0	9	9	3	3.000	292	255	1.145	9th–12th places
2	Philippines	3	2	1	6	7	4	1.750	253	244	1.037	9th–12th places
3	Hong Kong	3	1	2	3	5	7	0.714	287	282	1.018	13th–16th places
4	Lebanon	3	0	3	0	2	9	0.222	220	271	0.812	13th–16th places

Source: Daily Bulletin No.6

Date	Time	Venue		Score		Set 1	Set 2	Set 3	Set 4	Set 5	Total	Report
1 Aug	11:30	Court 2	Australia	3–1	Lebanon	23–25	25–15	25–19	25–21		98–80	Report
1 Aug	14:00	Court 2	Philippines	3–1	Hong Kong	18–25	25–20	28–26	26–24		97–95	Report
2 Aug	11:30	Court 2	Hong Kong	3–1	Lebanon	23–25	25–22	25–15	25–21		98–83	Report
2 Aug	14:00	Court 2	Australia	3–1	Philippines	25–21	25–20	17–25	25–15		92–81	Report

=== Pool H ===
Pos	Team	Pld	W	L	Pts	SW	SL	SR	SPW	SPL	SPR	Qualification
1	India	3	3	0	9	9	0	MAX	225	145	1.552	9th–12th places
2	Kazakhstan	3	2	1	6	6	3	2.000	204	199	1.025	9th–12th places
3	Saudi Arabia	3	1	2	3	3	6	0.500	182	210	0.867	13th–16th places
4	Kuwait	3	0	3	0	0	9	0.000	172	229	0.751	13th–16th places

Source: Daily Bulletin No.6

Date	Time	Venue		Score		Set 1	Set 2	Set 3	Set 4	Set 5	Total	Report
1 Aug	16:30	Court 2	Kazakhstan	3–0	Kuwait	25–20	25–20	25–23			75–63	Report
1 Aug	19:00	Court 2	India	3–0	Saudi Arabia	25–13	25–11	25–18			75–42	Report
2 Aug	16:30	Court 2	Saudi Arabia	3–0	Kuwait	25–14	25–19	29–27			79–60	Report
2 Aug	19:00	Court 2	Kazakhstan	0–3	India	16–25	19–25	19–25			54–75	Report

== Final round ==
- All times are Bahrain Time (UTC+03:00).

=== 13th–16th places ===
13th–16th semifinals
3 August
Hong Kong	3
Kuwait	1
3 August
Lebanon	3
Saudi Arabia	1

13th place match
4 August
Hong Kong	3
Lebanon	2
15th place match
4 August
Kuwait	0
Saudi Arabia	3

==== 13th–16th semifinals ====
Date	Time	Venue		Score		Set 1	Set 2	Set 3	Set 4	Set 5	Total	Report
3 Aug	11:30	Court 2	Hong Kong	3–1	Kuwait	18–25	25–27	25–21	25–14		93–87	Report
3 Aug	14:00	Court 2	Lebanon	3–1	Saudi Arabia	14–25	26–24	25–16	25–19		90–84	Report

==== 15th place match ====
Date	Time	Venue		Score		Set 1	Set 2	Set 3	Set 4	Set 5	Total	Report
4 Aug	10:30	Court 2	Kuwait	0–3	Saudi Arabia	19–25	23–25	24–26			66–76	P2

==== 13th place match ====
Date	Time	Venue		Score		Set 1	Set 2	Set 3	Set 4	Set 5	Total	Report
4 Aug	13:00	Court 2	Hong Kong	3–2	Lebanon	25–17	25–23	23–25	19–25	15–6	107–96	P2

=== 9th–12th places ===
9th–12th semifinals
3 August
Australia	0
Kazakhstan	3
3 August
Philippines	1
India	3

9th place match
4 August
Kazakhstan	0
India	3
11th place match
4 August
Australia	1
Philippines	3

==== 9th–12th semifinals ====
Date	Time	Venue		Score		Set 1	Set 2	Set 3	Set 4	Set 5	Total	Report
3 Aug	16:30	Court 2	Australia	0–3	Kazakhstan	18–25	17–25	16–25			51–75	Report
3 Aug	19:00	Court 2	Philippines	1–3	India	21–25	20–25	25–17	19–25		85–92	Report

==== 11th place match ====
Date	Time	Venue		Score		Set 1	Set 2	Set 3	Set 4	Set 5	Total	Report
4 Aug	15:30	Court 2	Australia	1–3	Philippines	18–25	21–25	25–15	23–25		87–90	P2

==== 9th place match ====
Date	Time	Venue		Score		Set 1	Set 2	Set 3	Set 4	Set 5	Total	Report
4 Aug	18:00	Court 2	Kazakhstan	0–3	India	21–25	23–25	15–25			59–75	P2

=== 5th–8th semifinals ===
5th–8th semifinals
3 August
Thailand	3
Chinese Taipei	1
3 August
Bahrain	0
South Korea	3

5th place match
4 August
Thailand	1
South Korea	3
7th place match
4 August
Chinese Taipei	1
Bahrain	3

==== 5th–8th semifinals ====
Date	Time	Venue		Score		Set 1	Set 2	Set 3	Set 4	Set 5	Total	Report
3 Aug	11:30	Court 1	Thailand	3–1	Chinese Taipei	26–24	25–21	17–25	25–22		93–92	Report
3 Aug	14:00	Court 1	Bahrain	0–3	South Korea	15–25	16–25	21–25			52–75	Report

==== 7th place match ====
Date	Time	Venue		Score		Set 1	Set 2	Set 3	Set 4	Set 5	Total	Report
4 Aug	11:30	Court 1	Chinese Taipei	1–3	Bahrain	23–25	25–23	29–31	18–25		95–104	P2

==== 5th place match ====
Date	Time	Venue		Score		Set 1	Set 2	Set 3	Set 4	Set 5	Total	Report
4 Aug	14:00	Court 1	Thailand	1–3	South Korea	22–25	25–23	21–25	17–25		85–98	P2

=== Final four ===
Semifinals
3 August
China	3
Pakistan	2
3 August
Iran	3
Japan	0

Final
4 August
China	3
Iran	2
3rd place match
4 August
Pakistan	3
Japan	0

==== Semifinals ====
Date	Time	Venue		Score		Set 1	Set 2	Set 3	Set 4	Set 5	Total	Report
3 Aug	16:30	Court 1	China	3–2	Pakistan	25–23	22–25	25–22	23–25	15–8	110–103	Report
3 Aug	19:00	Court 1	Iran	3–0	Japan	25–18	25–23	25–22			75–63	Report

==== 3rd place match ====
Date	Time	Venue		Score		Set 1	Set 2	Set 3	Set 4	Set 5	Total	Report
4 Aug	16:30	Court 1	Pakistan	3–0	Japan	25–13	25–22	25–17			75–52	Report

==== Final ====
Date	Time	Venue		Score		Set 1	Set 2	Set 3	Set 4	Set 5	Total	Report
4 Aug	19:00	Court 1	China	3–2	Iran	23–25	25–17	25–19	20–25	15–10	108–96	Report

== Final standing ==
Rank	Team
1st place, gold medalist(s)	China
2nd place, silver medalist(s)	Iran
3rd place, bronze medalist(s)	Pakistan
4	Japan
5	South Korea
6	Thailand
7	Bahrain
8	Chinese Taipei
9	India
10	Kazakhstan
11	Philippines
12	Australia
13	Hong Kong
14	Lebanon
15	Saudi Arabia
16	Kuwait

Qualified for the 2025 U19 World Championship

2024 Asian Men's U18 champions

China
First title

12–man roster
Ding Haocheng (c), Hu Hanlin, Yu Xiang, Gong Minghao, Wang Jinkebo, Zhao Nan, Zhang Hao, Niu Ge, Wang Kai, Gong Haoqian, Li Xuyang, Luo Zhenbo
Head coach
Hou Chundi

== Awards ==
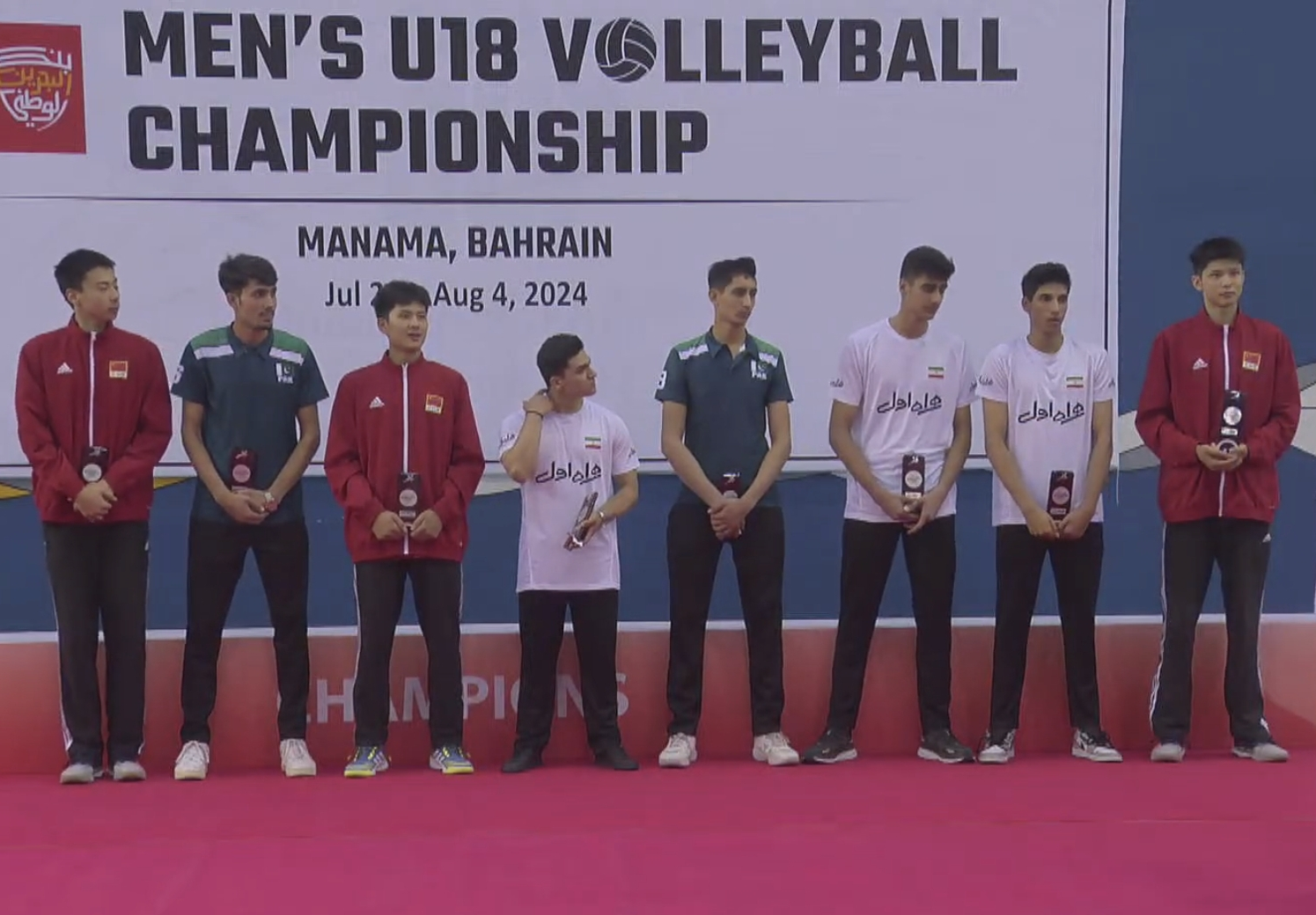
The Dream Team of the tournament.

- Most valuable player
  Ding Haocheng (CHN)
- Best setter
  Gong Haoqian (CHN)
- Best outside spikers
  Yu Xiang (CHN)
  Rahimi Mohammad Amin (IRI)
- Best middle blockers
  Bateni Mohammad Nima (IRI)
  Jabran Jabran (PAK)
- Best opposite spiker
  Yahya Muhammad (PAK)
- Best libero
  Arabyarmohammadi Mohammad Amin (IRI)

== Qualified teams for FIVB U19 World Championship ==
The following teams from AVC qualified for the 2025 FIVB Men's U19 World Championship.

Team	Qualified on	Previous appearances in the FIVB U19 World Championship^{1}
Pakistan	2 August 2024	0 (None)
Japan	2 August 2024	12 (1989, 1991, 1993, 1995, 1997, 1999, 2009, 2013, 2015, 2017, 2019, 2023)
China	3 August 2024	7 (1999, 2003, 2007, 2011, 2013, 2015, 2017)
Iran	3 August 2024	14 (1989, 1997, 2001, 2003, 2005, **2007**, 2009, 2011, 2013, 2015, **2017**, 2019, 2021, 2023)

^{1} Bold indicates champions for that year.

== See also ==
- 2024 Asian Women's U18 Volleyball Championship
- 2024 Asian Men's U20 Volleyball Championship
