= Saman Faezi =

Iranian volleyball player (born 1991)

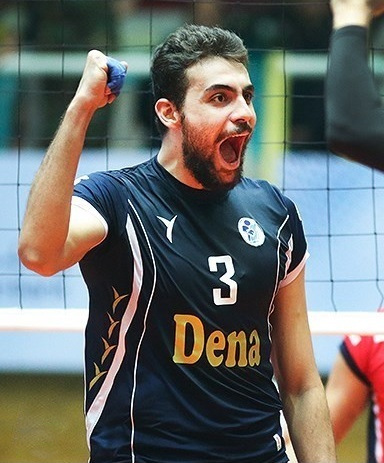

Personal information
- Full name: Saman Faezi
- Born: August 23, 1991 (age 35); Tehran, Iran
- Height: 2.04 m (6 ft 8 in)
- Weight: 87 kg (192 lb)
- Spike: 3.43 m (135 in)
- Block: 3.35 m (132 in)

Volleyball information
- Position: Middle Blocker
- Current club: Saipa

Career
Years	Teams
2009–2010; 2010–2013; 2013–2016; 2016–	(Iran) Erteashat (Iran) Saipa (Iran) Paykan (Iran) Saipa

National team
2008–2010; 2013–	Iran U19; Iran's seniors
Honours
Representing Iran
Men's volleyball
World Grand Champions Cup
Bronze medal – third place	2017 Japan	Team
Asian Games
Gold medal – first place	2018 Jakarta–Palembang	Team
Asian Cup
Gold medal – first place	2016 Nakhon Pathom	Team
U19 World Championship
Silver medal – second place	2009 Italy	Team
U19 Asian Championship
Gold medal – first place	2008 Sri Lanka	Team

Saman Faezi (Persian: سامان فائزی, born 23 August 1991 in Tehran) is an Iranian volleyball player who plays as a middle blocker for the Iranian national team.

== Honours ==
=== National team ===
- World Grand Champions Cup
  - Bronze: Osaka, Japan, 2017
- Asian Games
  - Gold: Jakarta-Palembang, Indonesia, 2018
- Asian Cup
  - Gold: Nakhon Pathom, Thailand, 2016
- U19 World Championship
  - Silver: Jesolo and Bassano del Grappa, Italy, 2009
- Asian U19 Championship
  - Gold: Colombo, Sri Lanka, 2008

=== Club ===
- Iranian Super League
  - : 2014-15 (Paykan)

=== Individual ===
- Best Middle Blocker: 2008 Asian U18 Championship
- Best Middle Blocker: 2010-11 Iranian Super League
- Best Middle Blocker: Nursultan Nazarbayev President's Cup, 2013
