= 2017 Asian Boys' U19 Volleyball Championship =

Tournament details
- Host country: Myanmar
- City: Naypyidaw
- Dates: 28 March – 5 April
- Teams: 11 (from 1 confederation)
- Venues: 2 (in 1 host city)

Final positions
- Champions: Japan (1st title)
- Runners-up: South Korea
- Third place: China
- Fourth place: Iran

Tournament awards
- MVP: (Japan) Kento Miyaura
- Best Setter: (South Korea) Choi Ik-je
- Best OH: (Iran) Morteza Sharifi (Japan) Mahiro Saeki
- Best MB: (China) Wang Dongchen (Japan) Shunichiro Sato
- Best OPP: (South Korea) Im Dong-hyeok
- Best Libero: (South Korea) Park Kyeong-min

The 2017 Asian Boys' U19 Volleyball Championship was held in Naypyidaw, Myanmar from 28 March to 5 April 2017. The tournament served as the Asian qualifier for the 2017 FIVB Volleyball Boys' U19 World Championship held in Bahrain for the top four ranked teams.

== Pools composition ==
Teams were seeded in the first two positions of each pool following the Serpentine system according to their final standing of the 2014 edition. AVC reserved the right to seed the hosts as head of pool A regardless of the final standing of the 2014 edition. All teams not seeded were drawn. But, Kazakhstan later withdrew. Final standing of the 2014 edition are shown in brackets except the hosts who did not participate in the 2014 edition.

Pool A	Pool B	Pool C	Pool D
Myanmar (Hosts)	Iran (1)	Japan (2)	China (3)
Australia (8)	South Korea (6)	Sri Lanka (5)	Chinese Taipei (4)
Hong Kong (13)	Bangladesh (–)	Thailand (–)	~~Kazakhstan (9)~~

== Venues ==
- Wunna Theikdi Sports Complex – Hall B, Naypyidaw, Myanmar – Pool A, B (excl. 28 March), C, D, E, F and Final eight
- Wunna Theikdi Sports Complex – Hall C, Naypyidaw, Myanmar – Pool B (only 28 March), G and 9th–11th places

== Pool standing procedure ==
1. Number of matches won
2. Match points
3. Sets ratio
4. Points ratio
5. Result of the last match between the tied teams

Match won 3–0 or 3–1: 3 match points for the winner, 0 match points for the loser
Match won 3–2: 2 match points for the winner, 1 match point for the loser

== Preliminary round ==
- All times are Myanmar Standard Time (UTC+06:30).

=== Pool A ===
Pos	Team	Pld	W	L	Pts	SW	SL	SR	SPW	SPL	SPR	Qualification
1	Myanmar	2	2	0	6	6	1	6.000	173	133	1.301	Pool E
2	Australia	2	1	1	3	4	3	1.333	161	141	1.142	Pool E
3	Hong Kong	2	0	2	0	0	6	0.000	90	150	0.600	Pool G

Date	Time		Score		Set 1	Set 2	Set 3	Set 4	Set 5	Total	Report
28 Mar	11:30	Hong Kong	0–3	Myanmar	15–25	17–25	15–25			47–75	P2
29 Mar	11:30	Australia	3–0	Hong Kong	25–15	25–7	25–21			75–43	P2
30 Mar	11:30	Myanmar	3–1	Australia	25–23	23–25	25–16	25–22		98–86	P2

=== Pool B ===
Pos	Team	Pld	W	L	Pts	SW	SL	SR	SPW	SPL	SPR	Qualification
1	South Korea	2	2	0	6	6	0	MAX	150	97	1.546	Pool F
2	Iran	2	1	1	3	3	3	1.000	136	111	1.225	Pool F
3	Bangladesh	2	0	2	0	0	6	0.000	72	150	0.480	9th–11th semifinal

Date	Time		Score		Set 1	Set 2	Set 3	Set 4	Set 5	Total	Report
28 Mar	14:00	South Korea	3–0	Bangladesh	25–12	25–13	25–11			75–36	P2
29 Mar	14:00	Iran	0–3	South Korea	19–25	21–25	21–25			61–75	P2
30 Mar	16:30	Bangladesh	0–3	Iran	11–25	12–25	13–25			36–75	P2

=== Pool C ===
Pos	Team	Pld	W	L	Pts	SW	SL	SR	SPW	SPL	SPR	Qualification
1	Japan	2	2	0	6	6	0	MAX	150	108	1.389	Pool E
2	Thailand	2	1	1	3	3	3	1.000	131	123	1.065	Pool E
3	Sri Lanka	2	0	2	0	0	6	0.000	100	150	0.667	Pool G

Date	Time		Score		Set 1	Set 2	Set 3	Set 4	Set 5	Total	Report
28 Mar	14:00	Thailand	3–0	Sri Lanka	25–10	25–15	25–23			75–48	P2
29 Mar	16:30	Japan	3–0	Sri Lanka	25–14	25–21	25–17			75–52	P2
30 Mar	14:00	Thailand	0–3	Japan	21–25	17–25	18–25			56–75	P2

=== Pool D ===
Pos	Team	Pld	W	L	Pts	SW	SL	SR	SPW	SPL	SPR	Qualification
1	China	1	1	0	3	3	1	3.000	103	90	1.144	Pool F
2	Chinese Taipei	1	0	1	0	1	3	0.333	90	103	0.874	Pool F

Date	Time		Score		Set 1	Set 2	Set 3	Set 4	Set 5	Total	Report
28 Mar	16:30	China	3–1	Chinese Taipei	28–30	25–23	25–19	25–18		103–90	P2

== Classification round ==
- All times are Myanmar Standard Time (UTC+06:30).
- The results and the points of the matches between the same teams that were already played during the preliminary round shall be taken into account for the classification round.

=== Pool E ===
Pos	Team	Pld	W	L	Pts	SW	SL	SR	SPW	SPL	SPR	Qualification
1	Japan	3	3	0	9	9	0	MAX	225	134	1.679	Quarterfinals
2	Thailand	3	1	2	3	4	6	0.667	217	237	0.916	Quarterfinals
3	Australia	3	1	2	3	4	7	0.571	220	257	0.856	Quarterfinals
4	Myanmar	3	1	2	3	3	7	0.429	204	238	0.857	Quarterfinals

Date	Time		Score		Set 1	Set 2	Set 3	Set 4	Set 5	Total	Report
1 Apr	15:20	Myanmar	0–3	Thailand	25–27	18–25	23–25			66–77	P2
1 Apr	17:30	Japan	3–0	Australia	25–15	25–13	25–10			75–38	P2
2 Apr	12:30	Myanmar	0–3	Japan	15–25	9–25	16–25			40–75	P2
2 Apr	15:00	Australia	3–1	Thailand	25–22	25–20	21–25	25–17		96–84	P2

=== Pool F ===
Pos	Team	Pld	W	L	Pts	SW	SL	SR	SPW	SPL	SPR	Qualification
1	South Korea	3	3	0	8	9	2	4.500	253	221	1.145	Quarterfinals
2	China	3	2	1	6	8	6	1.333	313	288	1.087	Quarterfinals
3	Iran	3	1	2	4	5	6	0.833	234	252	0.929	Quarterfinals
4	Chinese Taipei	3	0	3	0	1	9	0.111	217	256	0.848	Quarterfinals

Date	Time		Score		Set 1	Set 2	Set 3	Set 4	Set 5	Total	Report
1 Apr	10:00	South Korea	3–0	Chinese Taipei	25–14	25–23	25–22			75–59	P2
1 Apr	12:30	China	3–2	Iran	21–25	25–18	23–25	25–17	15–10	109–95	P2
2 Apr	10:00	Iran	3–0	Chinese Taipei	26–24	25–19	27–25			78–68	P2
2 Apr	17:30	South Korea	3–2	China	14–25	23–25	25–14	25–23	16–14	103–101	P2

=== Pool G ===
Pos	Team	Pld	W	L	Pts	SW	SL	SR	SPW	SPL	SPR	Qualification
1	Sri Lanka	1	1	0	3	3	1	3.000	98	87	1.126	9th place match
2	Hong Kong	1	0	1	0	1	3	0.333	87	98	0.888	9th–11th semifinal

Date	Time		Score		Set 1	Set 2	Set 3	Set 4	Set 5	Total	Report
1 Apr	15:00	Hong Kong	1–3	Sri Lanka	25–23	22–25	20–25	20–25		87–98	P2

== Final round ==
- All times are Myanmar Standard Time (UTC+06:30).

=== 9th–11th places ===
9th–11th semifinal
2 April
Bangladesh	3
Hong Kong	2

9th place match
3 April
Sri Lanka	3
Bangladesh	0

==== 9th–11th semifinal ====
Date	Time		Score		Set 1	Set 2	Set 3	Set 4	Set 5	Total	Report
2 Apr	15:00	Bangladesh	3–2	Hong Kong	25–10	18–25	16–25	25–23	15–11	99–94	P2

==== 9th place match ====
Date	Time		Score		Set 1	Set 2	Set 3	Set 4	Set 5	Total	Report
3 Apr	15:00	Sri Lanka	3–0	Bangladesh	25–0	25–0	25–0			75–0	Forfeit

=== Final eight ===
Quarterfinals
3 April
Japan	3
Chinese Taipei	0
3 April
China	3
Australia	0
3 April
South Korea	3
Myanmar	0
3 April
Thailand	0
Iran	3

Semifinals
4 April
Japan	3
China	0
4 April
South Korea	3
Iran	2

Final
5 April
Japan	3
South Korea	0
3rd place match
5 April
China	3
Iran	1

5th–8th semifinals
4 April
Myanmar	0
Thailand	3
4 April
Chinese Taipei	3
Australia	1

5th place match
5 April
Thailand	0
Chinese Taipei	3
7th place match
5 April
Myanmar	0
Australia	3

==== Quarterfinals ====
Date	Time		Score		Set 1	Set 2	Set 3	Set 4	Set 5	Total	Report
3 Apr	10:00	Japan	3–0	Chinese Taipei	25–19	25–20	25–14			75–53	P2
3 Apr	12:30	South Korea	3–0	Myanmar	25–11	25–14	25–12			75–37	P2
3 Apr	15:00	Thailand	0–3	Iran	16–25	19–25	19–25			54–75	P2
3 Apr	17:30	China	3–0	Australia	25–19	25–22	25–21			75–62	P2

==== 5th–8th semifinals ====
Date	Time		Score		Set 1	Set 2	Set 3	Set 4	Set 5	Total	Report
4 Apr	10:00	Myanmar	0–3	Thailand	15–25	18–25	17–25			50–75	P2
4 Apr	12:30	Chinese Taipei	3–1	Australia	25–19	25–15	19–25	25–21		94–80	P2

==== Semifinals ====
Date	Time		Score		Set 1	Set 2	Set 3	Set 4	Set 5	Total	Report
4 Apr	15:00	Japan	3–0	China	25–16	29–27	25–22			79–65	P2
4 Apr	17:30	South Korea	3–2	Iran	25–19	25–22	23–25	16–25	15–9	104–100	P2

==== 7th place match ====
Date	Time		Score		Set 1	Set 2	Set 3	Set 4	Set 5	Total	Report
5 Apr	10:00	Myanmar	0–3	Australia	14–25	23–25	19–25			56–75	P2

==== 5th place match ====
Date	Time		Score		Set 1	Set 2	Set 3	Set 4	Set 5	Total	Report
5 Apr	12:30	Thailand	0–3	Chinese Taipei	21–25	23–25	21–25			65–75	P2

==== 3rd place match ====
Date	Time		Score		Set 1	Set 2	Set 3	Set 4	Set 5	Total	Report
5 Apr	15:00	China	3–1	Iran	22–25	25–22	25–21	25–19		97–87	P2

==== Final ====
Date	Time		Score		Set 1	Set 2	Set 3	Set 4	Set 5	Total	Report
5 Apr	17:30	Japan	3–0	South Korea	25–17	25–18	25–19			75–54	P2

== Final standing ==
Rank	Team
1st place, gold medalist(s)	Japan
2nd place, silver medalist(s)	South Korea
3rd place, bronze medalist(s)	China
4	Iran
5	Chinese Taipei
6	Thailand
7	Australia
8	Myanmar
9	Sri Lanka
10	Bangladesh
11	Hong Kong

Qualified for the 2017 U19 World Championship

2017 Asian Boys' U19 champions

Japan
1st title

12–man roster
Miyaura (c), Nakamura, Kashimura, Kuwada, Kamijo, Nakahama, Nishida, Makara, Saeki, Ichikawa, Sato, Otsuka
Head coach
Honda

== Awards ==
- Most valuable player
  (Japan) Kento Miyaura
- Best setter
  (South Korea) Choi Ik-je
- Best outside spikers
  (Iran) Morteza Sharifi
  (Japan) Mahiro Saeki
- Best middle blockers
  (China) Wang Dongchen
  (Japan) Shunichiro Sato
- Best opposite spiker
  (South Korea) Im Dong-hyeok
- Best libero
  (South Korea) Park Kyeong-min

== See also ==
- 2017 Asian Girls' U18 Volleyball Championship
