= China men's national under-19 volleyball team =

Chinese Volleyball team

China
- Association: Chinese Volleyball Association
- Confederation: AVC

Uniforms
Home	Away	Third

Youth Olympic Games
- Appearances: No appearances

FIVB U19 World Championship
- Appearances: 8 (First in 1999)
- Best result: (silver) Runners-Up: (2007, 2013)

Asian U18 Championship
- Appearances: 15 (First in 1997)
- Best result: (gold) Gold: (2024)

The China men's national under-19 volleyball team represents China in men's under-19 volleyball Events, it is controlled and managed by the Chinese Volleyball Association that is a member of Asian volleyball body Asian Volleyball Confederation (AVC) and the international volleyball body government the Fédération Internationale de Volleyball (FIVB).

== Results ==
=== FIVB U19 World Championship ===
Champions Runners up Third place Fourth place

FIVB U19 World Championship
Year	Round	Position	GP	W	L	Squad
(United Arab Emirates) 1989	didn't qualify					
(Portugal) 1991	didn't qualify					
(Turkey) 1993	didn't qualify					
(Puerto Rico) 1995	didn't qualify					
(Iran) 1997	didn't qualify					
(Saudi Arabia) 1999		9th place				
(Egypt) 2001	didn't qualify					
(Thailand) 2003		9th place				
(Algeria) 2005	didn't qualify					
(Mexico) 2007	Final	Runners-up	8	5	3	
(Italy) 2009	didn't qualify					
(Argentina) 2011	Second round	8th place	8	2	6	
(Mexico) 2013	Final	Runners-up	8	6	2	
(Argentina) 2015	Quarterfinals	8th place	8	4	4	Squad
(Bahrain) 2017	Round of 16	10th place	8	3	5	
(Tunisia) 2019	didn't qualify					
(Iran) 2021	didn't qualify					
(Argentina) 2023	didn't qualify					
(Uzbekistan) 2025	Round of 16	9th place	9	7	2	
Total	8/19	0 Title(s)				—
