= 2014 Asian Boys' U18 Volleyball Championship =

2014 Asian Boys' U18 Championship

Tournament details
- Host country: Sri Lanka
- Dates: 5–13 September
- Teams: 15
- Venue: 1 (in 1 host city)

Final positions
- Champions: Iran (7th title)

Tournament awards
- MVP: (Iran) Rasoul Aghchehli

The 2014 Asian Boys' U18 Volleyball Championship was held in Colombo, Sri Lanka from 5 to 13 September 2014.

== Pools composition ==
The teams are seeded based on their final ranking at the 2012 Asian Youth Boys Volleyball Championship.

| Pool A | Pool B | Pool C | Pool D |
|---|---|---|---|
| Sri Lanka (Host & 6th); ~~Thailand (8th)~~ * Australia; Kazakhstan; Saudi Arabia | Iran (1st); India (7th); Qatar; Bahrain | China (2nd); Chinese Taipei (5th); Maldives; Hong Kong | Japan (3rd); South Korea (4th); Turkmenistan; ~~Pakistan~~ * |

* Withdrew

== Venue ==
- Sugathadasa Indoor Stadium, Colombo, Sri Lanka

== Preliminary round ==
- All times are Sri Lanka Standard Time (UTC+05:30).

=== Pool A ===
| Pos | Team | Pld | W | L | Pts | SW | SL | SR | SPW | SPL | SPR | Qualification |
|---|---|---|---|---|---|---|---|---|---|---|---|---|
| 1 | Sri Lanka | 3 | 3 | 0 | 9 | 9 | 0 | MAX | 225 | 158 | 1.424 | Pool E |
| 2 | Australia | 3 | 2 | 1 | 5 | 6 | 6 | 1.000 | 256 | 269 | 0.952 | Pool E |
| 3 | Saudi Arabia | 3 | 1 | 2 | 3 | 4 | 7 | 0.571 | 243 | 254 | 0.957 | 9th–15th semifinals |
| 4 | Kazakhstan | 3 | 0 | 3 | 1 | 3 | 9 | 0.333 | 233 | 276 | 0.844 | 9th–15th semifinals |

| Date | Time | | Score | | Set 1 | Set 2 | Set 3 | Set 4 | Set 5 | Total | Report |
|---|---|---|---|---|---|---|---|---|---|---|---|
| 05 Sep | 11:00 | Sri Lanka | 3–0 | Saudi Arabia | 25–14 | 25–15 | 25–19 | | | 75–48 | Report |
| 05 Sep | 13:00 | Australia | 3–2 | Kazakhstan | 25–19 | 18–25 | 20–25 | 25–20 | 15–8 | 103–97 | Report |
| 06 Sep | 18:00 | Sri Lanka | 3–0 | Australia | 25–19 | 25–18 | 25–22 | | | 75–59 | Report |
| 07 Sep | 10:00 | Saudi Arabia | 3–1 | Kazakhstan | 23–25 | 25–21 | 25–19 | 25–20 | | 98–85 | Report |
| 08 Sep | 10:00 | Australia | 3–1 | Saudi Arabia | 26–24 | 16–25 | 26–24 | 26–24 | | 94–97 | Report |
| 08 Sep | 16:15 | Kazakhstan | 0–3 | Sri Lanka | 15–25 | 16–25 | 20–25 | | | 51–75 | Report |

=== Pool B ===
| Pos | Team | Pld | W | L | Pts | SW | SL | SR | SPW | SPL | SPR | Qualification |
|---|---|---|---|---|---|---|---|---|---|---|---|---|
| 1 | Iran | 3 | 3 | 0 | 9 | 9 | 0 | MAX | 230 | 145 | 1.586 | Pool F |
| 2 | India | 3 | 2 | 1 | 6 | 6 | 3 | 2.000 | 207 | 166 | 1.247 | Pool F |
| 3 | Bahrain | 3 | 1 | 2 | 3 | 3 | 6 | 0.500 | 186 | 202 | 0.921 | 9th place match |
| 4 | Qatar | 3 | 0 | 3 | 0 | 0 | 9 | 0.000 | 115 | 225 | 0.511 | 9th–15th semifinals |

| Date | Time | | Score | | Set 1 | Set 2 | Set 3 | Set 4 | Set 5 | Total | Report |
|---|---|---|---|---|---|---|---|---|---|---|---|
| 06 Sep | 12:00 | Qatar | 0–3 | Iran | 6–25 | 12–25 | 13–25 | | | 31–75 | Report |
| 06 Sep | 14:00 | Bahrain | 0–3 | India | 14–25 | 17–25 | 23–25 | | | 54–75 | Report |
| 07 Sep | 12:40 | Iran | 3–0 | India | 25–19 | 25–23 | 25–15 | | | 75–57 | Report |
| 07 Sep | 14:00 | Qatar | 0–3 | Bahrain | 11–25 | 23–25 | 13–25 | | | 47–75 | Report |
| 08 Sep | 12:40 | Bahrain | 0–3 | Iran | 13–25 | 16–25 | 28–30 | | | 57–80 | Report |
| 08 Sep | 14:35 | India | 3–0 | Qatar | 25–12 | 25–15 | 25–10 | | | 75–37 | Report |

=== Pool C ===
| Pos | Team | Pld | W | L | Pts | SW | SL | SR | SPW | SPL | SPR | Qualification |
|---|---|---|---|---|---|---|---|---|---|---|---|---|
| 1 | Chinese Taipei | 3 | 3 | 0 | 9 | 9 | 1 | 9.000 | 246 | 176 | 1.398 | Pool E |
| 2 | China | 3 | 2 | 1 | 6 | 7 | 3 | 2.333 | 242 | 155 | 1.561 | Pool E |
| 3 | Hong Kong | 3 | 1 | 2 | 3 | 3 | 6 | 0.500 | 168 | 180 | 0.933 | 9th–15th semifinals |
| 4 | Maldives | 3 | 0 | 3 | 0 | 0 | 9 | 0.000 | 80 | 225 | 0.356 | 9th–15th semifinals |

| Date | Time | | Score | | Set 1 | Set 2 | Set 3 | Set 4 | Set 5 | Total | Report |
|---|---|---|---|---|---|---|---|---|---|---|---|
| 05 Sep | 15:00 | Chinese Taipei | 3–0 | Hong Kong | 25–18 | 25–20 | 25–16 | | | 75–54 | Report |
| 05 Sep | 17:00 | Maldives | 0–3 | China | 8–25 | 8–25 | 4–25 | | | 20–75 | Report |
| 06 Sep | 10:00 | Chinese Taipei | 3–0 | Maldives | 25–10 | 25–11 | 25–9 | | | 75–30 | Report |
| 06 Sep | 16:00 | Hong Kong | 0–3 | China | 5–25 | 14–25 | 20–25 | | | 39–75 | Report |
| 07 Sep | 16:25 | China | 1–3 | Chinese Taipei | 25–18 | 23–25 | 18–25 | 26–28 | | 92–96 | Report |
| 08 Sep | 18:05 | Maldives | 0–3 | Hong Kong | 8–25 | 10–25 | 12–25 | | | 30–75 | Report |

=== Pool D ===
| Pos | Team | Pld | W | L | Pts | SW | SL | SR | SPW | SPL | SPR | Qualification |
|---|---|---|---|---|---|---|---|---|---|---|---|---|
| 1 | Japan | 2 | 2 | 0 | 5 | 6 | 2 | 3.000 | 181 | 150 | 1.207 | Pool F |
| 2 | South Korea | 2 | 1 | 1 | 4 | 5 | 3 | 1.667 | 180 | 161 | 1.118 | Pool F |
| 3 | Turkmenistan | 2 | 0 | 2 | 0 | 0 | 6 | 0.000 | 100 | 150 | 0.667 | 9th–15th semifinals |

| Date | Time | | Score | | Set 1 | Set 2 | Set 3 | Set 4 | Set 5 | Total | Report |
|---|---|---|---|---|---|---|---|---|---|---|---|
| 05 Sep | 19:00 | South Korea | 3–0 | Turkmenistan | 25–18 | 25–17 | 25–20 | | | 75–55 | Report |
| 06 Sep | 20:00 | Japan | 3–0 | Turkmenistan | 25–18 | 25–10 | 25–17 | | | 75–45 | Report |
| 07 Sep | 18:45 | South Korea | 2–3 | Japan | 23–25 | 19–25 | 25–20 | 25–21 | 13–15 | 105–106 | Report |

== Classification round ==
- All times are Sri Lanka Standard Time (UTC+05:30).
- The results and the points of the matches between the same teams that were already played during the preliminary round shall be taken into account for the classification round.

=== Pool E ===
| Pos | Team | Pld | W | L | Pts | SW | SL | SR | SPW | SPL | SPR | Qualification |
|---|---|---|---|---|---|---|---|---|---|---|---|---|
| 1 | Chinese Taipei | 3 | 3 | 0 | 9 | 9 | 2 | 4.500 | 267 | 205 | 1.302 | Quarterfinals |
| 2 | China | 3 | 2 | 1 | 6 | 7 | 4 | 1.750 | 259 | 245 | 1.057 | Quarterfinals |
| 3 | Sri Lanka | 3 | 1 | 2 | 3 | 3 | 6 | 0.500 | 187 | 209 | 0.895 | Quarterfinals |
| 4 | Australia | 3 | 0 | 3 | 0 | 2 | 9 | 0.222 | 209 | 263 | 0.795 | Quarterfinals |

| Date | Time | | Score | | Set 1 | Set 2 | Set 3 | Set 4 | Set 5 | Total | Report |
|---|---|---|---|---|---|---|---|---|---|---|---|
| 09 Sep | 14:55 | Sri Lanka | 0–3 | China | 19–25 | 21–25 | 23–25 | | | 63–75 | Report |
| 09 Sep | 16:50 | Chinese Taipei | 3–1 | Australia | 21–25 | 25–13 | 25–15 | 25–11 | | 96–64 | Report |
| 10 Sep | 12:35 | Australia | 1–3 | China | 19–25 | 25–17 | 21–25 | 21–25 | | 86–92 | Report |
| 10 Sep | 14:55 | Sri Lanka | 0–3 | Chinese Taipei | 20–25 | 18–25 | 11–25 | | | 49–75 | Report |

=== Pool F ===
| Pos | Team | Pld | W | L | Pts | SW | SL | SR | SPW | SPL | SPR | Qualification |
|---|---|---|---|---|---|---|---|---|---|---|---|---|
| 1 | Iran | 3 | 3 | 0 | 9 | 9 | 0 | MAX | 225 | 172 | 1.308 | Quarterfinals |
| 2 | Japan | 3 | 2 | 1 | 5 | 6 | 6 | 1.000 | 259 | 267 | 0.970 | Quarterfinals |
| 3 | South Korea | 3 | 1 | 2 | 4 | 5 | 6 | 0.833 | 243 | 232 | 1.047 | Quarterfinals |
| 4 | India | 3 | 0 | 3 | 0 | 1 | 9 | 0.111 | 195 | 251 | 0.777 | Quarterfinals |

| Date | Time | | Score | | Set 1 | Set 2 | Set 3 | Set 4 | Set 5 | Total | Report |
|---|---|---|---|---|---|---|---|---|---|---|---|
| 09 Sep | 18:55 | Iran | 3–0 | South Korea | 25–22 | 25–23 | 25–18 | | | 75–63 | Report |
| 09 Sep | 20:50 | Japan | 3–1 | India | 26–28 | 25–22 | 25–20 | 25–17 | | 101–87 | Report |
| 10 Sep | 16:40 | India | 0–3 | South Korea | 15–25 | 16–25 | 20–25 | | | 51–75 | Report |
| 10 Sep | 18:30 | Iran | 3–0 | Japan | 25–19 | 25–16 | 25–17 | | | 75–52 | Report |

== Final round ==
- All times are Sri Lanka Standard Time (UTC+05:30).

=== 9th–15th places ===
9th–15th semifinals
9 September
Saudi Arabia | 3
Maldives | 0
9 September
Hong Kong | 2
Kazakhstan | 3
10 September
Turkmenistan | 3
Qatar | 1

9th place matches
12 September
Saudi Arabia | 1
Kazakhstan | 3
12 September
Bahrain | 3
Turkmenistan | 0

Tied for 9th place
Kazakhstan | –
Bahrain | –
Tied for 11th place
Saudi Arabia | –
Turkmenistan | –

==== 9th–15th semifinals ====
| Date | Time | | Score | | Set 1 | Set 2 | Set 3 | Set 4 | Set 5 | Total | Report |
|---|---|---|---|---|---|---|---|---|---|---|---|
| 09 Sep | 10:00 | Saudi Arabia | 3–0 | Maldives | 25–17 | 25–11 | 25–11 | | | 75–39 | Report |
| 09 Sep | 12:00 | Hong Kong | 2–3 | Kazakhstan | 25–20 | 14–25 | 24–26 | 27–25 | 11–15 | 101–111 | Report |
| 10 Sep | 10:00 | Turkmenistan | 3–1 | Qatar | 23–25 | 25–16 | 25–23 | 25–21 | | 98–85 | Report |

==== 13th place match ====
| Date | Time | | Score | | Set 1 | Set 2 | Set 3 | Set 4 | Set 5 | Total | Report |
|---|---|---|---|---|---|---|---|---|---|---|---|
| 11 Sep | 10:00 | Maldives | 0–3 | Hong Kong | 15–25 | 14–25 | 24–26 | | | 53–76 | Report |

==== 9th place matches ====
| Date | Time | | Score | | Set 1 | Set 2 | Set 3 | Set 4 | Set 5 | Total | Report |
|---|---|---|---|---|---|---|---|---|---|---|---|
| 12 Sep | 10:00 | Saudi Arabia | 1–3 | Kazakhstan | 24–26 | 27–25 | 17–25 | 15–25 | | 83–101 | Report |
| 12 Sep | 12:30 | Bahrain | 3–0 | Turkmenistan | 25–21 | 25–15 | 25–15 | | | 75–51 | Report |

=== Final eight ===
Quarterfinals
11 September
Chinese Taipei | 3
India | 0
11 September
Japan | 3
Sri Lanka | 0
11 September
Iran | 3
Australia | 0
11 September
China | 3
South Korea | 2

Semifinals
12 September
Chinese Taipei | 0
Japan | 3
12 September
Iran | 3
China | 0

Final
13 September
Japan | 0
Iran | 3
3rd place match
13 September
Chinese Taipei | 1
China | 3

5th–8th semifinals
12 September
India | 2
Sri Lanka | 3
12 September
Australia | 1
South Korea | 3

5th place match
13 September
Sri Lanka | 3
South Korea | 2
7th place match
13 September
India | 3
Australia | 0

==== Quarterfinals ====
| Date | Time | | Score | | Set 1 | Set 2 | Set 3 | Set 4 | Set 5 | Total | Report |
|---|---|---|---|---|---|---|---|---|---|---|---|
| 11 Sep | 12:00 | Chinese Taipei | 3–0 | India | 25–20 | 25–20 | 25–15 | | | 75–55 | Report |
| 11 Sep | 14:00 | Iran | 3–0 | Australia | 25–14 | 25–12 | 25–17 | | | 75–43 | Report |
| 11 Sep | 16:00 | China | 3–2 | South Korea | 16–25 | 20–25 | 25–22 | 25–18 | 15–10 | 101–100 | Report |
| 11 Sep | 18:40 | Japan | 3–0 | Sri Lanka | 25–10 | 25–14 | 25–13 | | | 75–37 | Report |

==== 5th–8th semifinals ====
| Date | Time | | Score | | Set 1 | Set 2 | Set 3 | Set 4 | Set 5 | Total | Report |
|---|---|---|---|---|---|---|---|---|---|---|---|
| 12 Sep | 14:20 | India | 2–3 | Sri Lanka | 25–15 | 25–15 | 15–25 | 23–25 | 12–15 | 100–95 | Report |
| 12 Sep | 16:45 | Australia | 1–3 | South Korea | 25–23 | 28–30 | 14–25 | 12–25 | | 79–103 | Report |

==== Semifinals ====
| Date | Time | | Score | | Set 1 | Set 2 | Set 3 | Set 4 | Set 5 | Total | Report |
|---|---|---|---|---|---|---|---|---|---|---|---|
| 12 Sep | 19:05 | Chinese Taipei | 0–3 | Japan | 17–25 | 20–25 | 20–25 | | | 57–75 | Report |
| 12 Sep | 20:50 | Iran | 3–0 | China | 25–12 | 25–13 | 25–18 | | | 75–43 | Report |

==== 7th place match ====
| Date | Time | | Score | | Set 1 | Set 2 | Set 3 | Set 4 | Set 5 | Total | Report |
|---|---|---|---|---|---|---|---|---|---|---|---|
| 13 Sep | 10:00 | India | 3–0 | Australia | 25–13 | 25–23 | 25–14 | | | 75–50 | Report |

==== 5th place match ====
| Date | Time | | Score | | Set 1 | Set 2 | Set 3 | Set 4 | Set 5 | Total | Report |
|---|---|---|---|---|---|---|---|---|---|---|---|
| 13 Sep | 12:00 | Sri Lanka | 3–2 | South Korea | 21–25 | 25–21 | 25–22 | 23–25 | 23–21 | 117–114 | Report |

==== 3rd place match ====
| Date | Time | | Score | | Set 1 | Set 2 | Set 3 | Set 4 | Set 5 | Total | Report |
|---|---|---|---|---|---|---|---|---|---|---|---|
| 13 Sep | 15:10 | Chinese Taipei | 1–3 | China | 26–24 | 19–25 | 21–25 | 18–25 | | 84–99 | Report |

==== Final ====
| Date | Time | | Score | | Set 1 | Set 2 | Set 3 | Set 4 | Set 5 | Total | Report |
|---|---|---|---|---|---|---|---|---|---|---|---|
| 13 Sep | 17:25 | Japan | 0–3 | Iran | 11–25 | 22–25 | 23–25 | | | 56–75 | Report |

== Final standing ==
| Rank | Team |
|---|---|
| 1st place, gold medalist(s) | Iran |
| 2nd place, silver medalist(s) | Japan |
| 3rd place, bronze medalist(s) | China |
| 4 | Chinese Taipei |
| 5 | Sri Lanka |
| 6 | South Korea |
| 7 | India |
| 8 | Australia |
| 9 | Bahrain |
| 9 | Kazakhstan |
| 11 | Saudi Arabia |
| 11 | Turkmenistan |
| 13 | Hong Kong |
| 14 | Maldives |
| 15 | Qatar |

| Qualified for the 2015 U19 World Championship |

2014 Asian Boys' U18 champions

Iran
7th title

12–man roster
Baratitaarghi, Katal, Mousavi, Talebi, Mojarrad, Eini, Aghchehli (c), Paydar, Esfandiar, Ramezani, Karimi, Rasooli
Head coach
Vakili

== Awards ==
- Most valuable player
  (Iran) Rasoul Aghchehli
- Best setter
  (Iran) Javad Karimi
- Best outside spikers
  (Iran) Amirhossein Esfandiar
  (Chinese Taipei) Jan Min-han
- Best middle blockers
  (Iran) Ali Asghar Mojarrad
  (China) Tao Zixuan
- Best opposite spiker
  (Iran) Rasoul Aghchehli
- Best libero
  (Japan) Tomohiro Horie
