= 2003 Asian Youth Boys' Volleyball Championship =

Tournament details
- Host country: India
- Dates: 6–13 April
- Teams: 9
- Venue: 1 (in 1 host city)

Final positions
- Champions: India (1st title)

Tournament awards
- MVP: (India) Sanjay Kumar

The 2003 Asian Youth Boys' Volleyball Championship was held at the Rajiv Gandhi Indoor Stadium, Visakhapatnam, India from 6 to 13 April 2003.

== Pools composition ==
The teams were seeded based on their final ranking at the 2001 Asian Youth Boys Volleyball Championship.

Pool A	Pool B
India (Host); Chinese Taipei (3rd); ~~Japan~~ * Thailand; Qatar	Iran (1st); South Korea (2nd); China; Australia; North Korea

* Withdrew

== Preliminary round ==
=== Pool A ===
Pos	Team	Pld	W	L	Pts	SW	SL	SR	SPW	SPL	SPR	Qualification
1	India	3	3	0	6	9	1	9.000	250	176	1.420	Quarterfinals
2	Thailand	3	2	1	5	7	4	1.750	242	244	0.992	Quarterfinals
3	Qatar	3	1	2	4	3	7	0.429	210	242	0.868	Quarterfinals
4	Chinese Taipei	3	0	3	3	2	9	0.222	232	272	0.853	Quarterfinals

Date		Score		Set 1	Set 2	Set 3	Set 4	Set 5	Total
06 Apr	Chinese Taipei	1–3	Qatar	23–25	25–27	25–22	19–25		92–99
06 Apr	Thailand	1–3	India	27–25	17–25	17–25	8–25		69–100
07 Apr	Thailand	3–1	Chinese Taipei	33–31	25–20	15–25	25–17		98–93
08 Apr	India	3–0	Chinese Taipei	25–14	25–19	25–14			75–47
09 Apr	Qatar	0–3	Thailand	26–28	19–25	26–28			51–75
10 Apr	Qatar	0–3	India	22–25	16–25	22–25			60–75

=== Pool B ===
Pos	Team	Pld	W	L	Pts	SW	SL	SR	SPW	SPL	SPR	Qualification
1	Iran	4	4	0	8	12	1	12.000	321	246	1.305	Quarterfinals
2	North Korea	4	3	1	7	9	8	1.125	365	376	0.971	Quarterfinals
3	China	4	2	2	6	8	9	0.889	369	391	0.944	Quarterfinals
4	Australia	4	1	3	5	7	9	0.778	341	346	0.986	Quarterfinals
5	South Korea	4	0	4	4	3	12	0.250	321	358	0.897	

Date		Score		Set 1	Set 2	Set 3	Set 4	Set 5	Total
06 Apr	Australia	2–3	China	23–25	24–26	25–12	25–21	13–15	110–99
06 Apr	North Korea	0–3	Iran	19–25	18–25	15–25			52–75
07 Apr	Australia	2–3	North Korea	25–21	21–25	25–19	21–25	9–15	101–105
07 Apr	South Korea	0–3	Iran	20–25	17–25	16–25			53–75
08 Apr	China	1–3	North Korea	25–16	25–27	21–25	20–25		91–93
08 Apr	South Korea	0–3	Australia	22–25	22–25	23–25			67–75
09 Apr	Iran	3–0	Australia	25–15	25–18	25–22			75–55
09 Apr	China	3–1	South Korea	16–25	25–20	25–22	27–25		93–92
10 Apr	North Korea	3–2	South Korea	25–27	26–24	25–16	20–25	19–17	115–109
10 Apr	Iran	3–1	China	21–25	25–15	25–23	25–23		96–86

== Final round ==
Quarterfinals
11 April – Visakhapatnam
India	3
Australia	1
11 April – Visakhapatnam
North Korea	3
Qatar	0
11 April – Visakhapatnam
Iran	3
Chinese Taipei	0
11 April – Visakhapatnam
Thailand	0
China	3

Semifinals
12 April – Visakhapatnam
India	3
North Korea	0
12 April – Visakhapatnam
Iran	3
China	1

Final
13 April – Visakhapatnam
India	3
Iran	1
3rd place
13 April – Visakhapatnam
North Korea	3
China	0

5th–8th places
13 April – Visakhapatnam
Australia	3
Qatar	0
13 April – Visakhapatnam
Chinese Taipei	2
Thailand	3

5th place
13 April – Visakhapatnam
Australia	0
Thailand	3
7th place
13 April – Visakhapatnam
Qatar	3
Chinese Taipei	1

=== Quarterfinals ===
Date		Score		Set 1	Set 2	Set 3	Set 4	Set 5	Total
11 Apr	Thailand	0–3	China	15–25	22–25	22–25			59–75
11 Apr	North Korea	3–0	Qatar	25–19	25–20	25–22			75–61
11 Apr	Iran	3–0	Chinese Taipei	25–18	25–18	25–14			75–50
11 Apr	India	3–1	Australia	25–19	25–23	18–25	25–21		93–88

=== 5th–8th semifinals ===
Date		Score		Set 1	Set 2	Set 3	Set 4	Set 5	Total
12 Apr	Chinese Taipei	2–3	Thailand	25–20	22–25	26–24	18–25	16–18	107–112
12 Apr	Australia	3–0	Qatar	25–15	25–20	25–18			75–53

=== Semifinals ===
Date		Score		Set 1	Set 2	Set 3	Set 4	Set 5	Total
12 Apr	Iran	3–1	China	24–26	25–17	25–23	25–18		99–84
12 Apr	India	3–0	North Korea	26–24	25–23	25–21			76–68

=== 7th place ===
Date		Score		Set 1	Set 2	Set 3	Set 4	Set 5	Total
13 Apr	Qatar	3–1	Chinese Taipei	25–15	22–25	25–22	25–19		97–81

=== 5th place ===
Date		Score		Set 1	Set 2	Set 3	Set 4	Set 5	Total
13 Apr	Australia	0–3	Thailand	22–25	14–25	16–25			52–75

=== 3rd place ===
Date		Score		Set 1	Set 2	Set 3	Set 4	Set 5	Total
13 Apr	North Korea	3–0	China	25–21	25–20	28–26			78–67

=== Final ===
Date		Score		Set 1	Set 2	Set 3	Set 4	Set 5	Total
13 Apr	India	3–1	Iran	25–23	30–28	23–25	25–20		103–96

== Final standing ==
Rank	Team
1st place, gold medalist(s)	India
2nd place, silver medalist(s)	Iran
3rd place, bronze medalist(s)	North Korea
4	China
5	Thailand
6	Australia
7	Qatar
8	Chinese Taipei
9	South Korea

Qualified for the 2003 FIVB Youth World Championship

2003 Asian Youth Boys champions

India
First title

== Awards ==
- MVP: (India) Sanjay Kumar
- Best scorer: (Iran) Mohammad Soleimani
- Best spiker: (North Korea) Pak Yong-nam
- Best blocker: (India) Sanjay Kumar
- Best server: (Iran) Arash Sadeghiani
- Best setter: (India) Ramaswami Kamraj
- Best digger: (Iran) Moslem Mohammadizadeh
- Best receiver: (India) P. S. Srikanth
- Special award: (Australia) Zane Christensen
