= 2008 Asian Youth Boys' Volleyball Championship =

Tournament details
- Host country: Sri Lanka
- Dates: 14–22 October
- Teams: 11
- Venue: 1 (in 1 host city)

Final positions
- Champions: Iran (4th title)

Tournament awards
- MVP: (Iran) Farhad Salafzoun

The 2008 Asian Youth Boys' Volleyball Championship was held at the Sugathadasa Indoor Stadium, Colombo, Sri Lanka from 14 to 22 October 2008.

== Pools composition ==
The teams were seeded based on their final ranking at the 2007 Asian Youth Boys Volleyball Championship.

| Pool A | Pool B |
|---|---|
| Sri Lanka (Host); China (3rd); Chinese Taipei; Maldives; ~~Indonesia~~ * Australia | Iran (1st); India (2nd); Japan; Kazakhstan; Thailand; Kuwait |

* Withdrew

== Preliminary round ==
=== Pool A ===
| Pos | Team | Pld | W | L | Pts | SW | SL | SR | SPW | SPL | SPR | Qualification |
|---|---|---|---|---|---|---|---|---|---|---|---|---|
| 1 | China | 4 | 4 | 0 | 8 | 12 | 2 | 6.000 | 342 | 243 | 1.407 | Quarterfinals |
| 2 | Chinese Taipei | 4 | 3 | 1 | 7 | 11 | 3 | 3.667 | 330 | 241 | 1.369 | Quarterfinals |
| 3 | Australia | 4 | 2 | 2 | 6 | 6 | 7 | 0.857 | 273 | 291 | 0.938 | Quarterfinals |
| 4 | Sri Lanka | 4 | 1 | 3 | 5 | 4 | 9 | 0.444 | 287 | 284 | 1.011 | Quarterfinals |
| 5 | Maldives | 4 | 0 | 4 | 4 | 0 | 12 | 0.000 | 127 | 300 | 0.423 | |

| Date | Time | | Score | | Set 1 | Set 2 | Set 3 | Set 4 | Set 5 | Total |
|---|---|---|---|---|---|---|---|---|---|---|
| 14 Oct | 15:00 | Chinese Taipei | 2–3 | China | 24–26 | 25–22 | 21–25 | 25–22 | 10–15 | 105–110 |
| 14 Oct | 17:00 | Sri Lanka | 3–0 | Maldives | 25–13 | 25–7 | 25–10 | | | 75–30 |
| 15 Oct | 15:00 | Australia | 0–3 | Chinese Taipei | 17–25 | 12–25 | 16–25 | | | 45–75 |
| 15 Oct | 19:00 | China | 3–0 | Maldives | 25–5 | 25–9 | 25–14 | | | 75–28 |
| 16 Oct | 15:00 | Maldives | 0–3 | Chinese Taipei | 10–25 | 7–25 | 7–25 | | | 24–75 |
| 16 Oct | 17:00 | Australia | 3–1 | Sri Lanka | 23–25 | 26–24 | 25–23 | 25–22 | | 99–94 |
| 17 Oct | 15:00 | China | 3–0 | Sri Lanka | 25–20 | 25–8 | 30–28 | | | 80–56 |
| 17 Oct | 19:00 | Australia | 3–0 | Maldives | 25–15 | 25–15 | 25–15 | | | 75–45 |
| 18 Oct | 17:00 | Chinese Taipei | 3–0 | Sri Lanka | 25–22 | 25–20 | 25–20 | | | 75–62 |
| 18 Oct | 19:00 | China | 3–0 | Australia | 25–17 | 27–25 | 25–12 | | | 77–54 |

=== Pool B ===
| Pos | Team | Pld | W | L | Pts | SW | SL | SR | SPW | SPL | SPR | Qualification |
|---|---|---|---|---|---|---|---|---|---|---|---|---|
| 1 | Iran | 5 | 5 | 0 | 10 | 15 | 2 | 7.500 | 418 | 300 | 1.393 | Quarterfinals |
| 2 | Japan | 5 | 4 | 1 | 9 | 13 | 5 | 2.600 | 434 | 365 | 1.189 | Quarterfinals |
| 3 | India | 5 | 3 | 2 | 8 | 12 | 6 | 2.000 | 414 | 358 | 1.156 | Quarterfinals |
| 4 | Thailand | 5 | 2 | 3 | 7 | 6 | 9 | 0.667 | 341 | 309 | 1.104 | Quarterfinals |
| 5 | Kuwait | 5 | 1 | 4 | 6 | 3 | 12 | 0.250 | 238 | 364 | 0.654 | |
| 6 | Kazakhstan | 5 | 0 | 5 | 5 | 0 | 15 | 0.000 | 226 | 375 | 0.603 | |

| Date | Time | | Score | | Set 1 | Set 2 | Set 3 | Set 4 | Set 5 | Total |
|---|---|---|---|---|---|---|---|---|---|---|
| 14 Oct | 09:00 | Japan | 1–3 | Iran | 21–25 | 25–17 | 25–27 | 21–25 | | 92–94 |
| 14 Oct | 11:00 | India | 3–0 | Thailand | 25–20 | 26–24 | 25–21 | | | 76–65 |
| 14 Oct | 13:00 | Kuwait | 3–0 | Kazakhstan | 25–18 | 25–23 | 25–23 | | | 75–64 |
| 15 Oct | 09:00 | Iran | 3–0 | Thailand | 25–16 | 25–18 | 25–19 | | | 75–53 |
| 15 Oct | 11:00 | Japan | 3–0 | Kazakhstan | 25–17 | 25–10 | 25–14 | | | 75–41 |
| 15 Oct | 13:00 | India | 3–0 | Kuwait | 25–12 | 25–13 | 25–14 | | | 75–39 |
| 16 Oct | 09:00 | Kazakhstan | 0–3 | Iran | 13–25 | 6–25 | 14–25 | | | 33–75 |
| 16 Oct | 11:00 | Thailand | 3–0 | Kuwait | 25–8 | 25–12 | 25–13 | | | 75–33 |
| 16 Oct | 13:00 | Japan | 3–2 | India | 21–25 | 25–21 | 25–22 | 25–27 | 15–12 | 111–107 |
| 17 Oct | 09:00 | Iran | 3–0 | Kuwait | 25–14 | 25–17 | 25–10 | | | 75–41 |
| 17 Oct | 11:00 | Kazakhstan | 0–3 | India | 10–25 | 16–25 | 18–25 | | | 44–75 |
| 17 Oct | 13:00 | Thailand | 0–3 | Japan | 21–25 | 29–31 | 23–25 | | | 73–81 |
| 18 Oct | 09:00 | Kuwait | 0–3 | Japan | 15–25 | 17–25 | 18–25 | | | 50–75 |
| 18 Oct | 11:00 | India | 1–3 | Iran | 20–25 | 18–25 | 26–24 | 17–25 | | 81–99 |
| 18 Oct | 13:00 | Kazakhstan | 0–3 | Thailand | 15–25 | 16–25 | 13–25 | | | 44–75 |

== Classification 9th–11th ==
9th–11th places
20 October – Colombo
Maldives | 0
Kazakhstan | 3
20 October – Colombo
Kuwait
Bye

9th place
21 October – Colombo
Kazakhstan | 3
Kuwait | 0

=== Semifinals ===
| Date | Time | | Score | | Set 1 | Set 2 | Set 3 | Set 4 | Set 5 | Total |
|---|---|---|---|---|---|---|---|---|---|---|
| 20 Oct | 11:00 | Maldives | 0–3 | Kazakhstan | 12–25 | 8–25 | 8–25 | | | 28–75 |

=== 9th place ===
| Date | Time | | Score | | Set 1 | Set 2 | Set 3 | Set 4 | Set 5 | Total |
|---|---|---|---|---|---|---|---|---|---|---|
| 21 Oct | 11:00 | Kazakhstan | 3–0 | Kuwait | 25–19 | 25–21 | 25–15 | | | 75–55 |

== Final round ==
=== Championship ===
Quarterfinals
20 October – Colombo
China | 3
Thailand | 0
20 October – Colombo
Japan | 3
Australia | 0
20 October – Colombo
Iran | 3
Sri Lanka | 0
20 October – Colombo
Chinese Taipei | 2
India | 3

Semifinals
21 October – Colombo
China | 2
Japan | 3
21 October – Colombo
Iran | 3
India | 2

Final
22 October – Colombo
Japan | 0
Iran | 3
3rd place
22 October – Colombo
China | 2
India | 3

5th–8th places
21 October – Colombo
Thailand | 3
Australia | 0
21 October – Colombo
Sri Lanka | 1
Chinese Taipei | 3

5th place
22 October – Colombo
Thailand | 0
Chinese Taipei | 3
7th place
22 October – Colombo
Australia | 2
Sri Lanka | 3

=== Quarterfinals ===
| Date | Time | | Score | | Set 1 | Set 2 | Set 3 | Set 4 | Set 5 | Total |
|---|---|---|---|---|---|---|---|---|---|---|
| 20 Oct | 13:00 | China | 3–0 | Thailand | 25–21 | 25–10 | 25–15 | | | 75–46 |
| 20 Oct | 15:00 | Iran | 3–0 | Sri Lanka | 25–11 | 25–16 | 25–9 | | | 75–36 |
| 20 Oct | 17:00 | Chinese Taipei | 2–3 | India | 25–21 | 22–25 | 17–25 | 25–17 | 13–15 | 102–103 |
| 20 Oct | 19:00 | Japan | 3–0 | Australia | 28–26 | 25–23 | 25–21 | | | 78–70 |

=== 5th–8th semifinals ===
| Date | Time | | Score | | Set 1 | Set 2 | Set 3 | Set 4 | Set 5 | Total |
|---|---|---|---|---|---|---|---|---|---|---|
| 21 Oct | 13:00 | Thailand | 3–0 | Australia | 25–16 | 25–19 | 25–17 | | | 75–52 |
| 21 Oct | 15:00 | Sri Lanka | 1–3 | Chinese Taipei | 24–26 | 19–25 | 25–19 | 13–25 | | 81–95 |

=== Semifinals ===
| Date | Time | | Score | | Set 1 | Set 2 | Set 3 | Set 4 | Set 5 | Total |
|---|---|---|---|---|---|---|---|---|---|---|
| 21 Oct | 17:00 | China | 2–3 | Japan | 27–25 | 25–18 | 23–25 | 17–25 | 12–15 | 104–105 |
| 21 Oct | 19:00 | Iran | 3–2 | India | 22–25 | 25–20 | 30–32 | 25–18 | 15–10 | 117–105 |

=== 7th place ===
| Date | Time | | Score | | Set 1 | Set 2 | Set 3 | Set 4 | Set 5 | Total |
|---|---|---|---|---|---|---|---|---|---|---|
| 22 Oct | 09:00 | Australia | 2–3 | Sri Lanka | 13–25 | 25–15 | 34–32 | 23–25 | 14–16 | 109–113 |

=== 5th place ===
| Date | Time | | Score | | Set 1 | Set 2 | Set 3 | Set 4 | Set 5 | Total |
|---|---|---|---|---|---|---|---|---|---|---|
| 22 Oct | 11:00 | Thailand | 0–3 | Chinese Taipei | | | | | | |

=== 3rd place ===
| Date | Time | | Score | | Set 1 | Set 2 | Set 3 | Set 4 | Set 5 | Total |
|---|---|---|---|---|---|---|---|---|---|---|
| 22 Oct | 15:00 | China | 2–3 | India | 21–25 | 25–21 | 25–21 | 18–25 | 11–15 | 100–107 |

=== Final ===
| Date | Time | | Score | | Set 1 | Set 2 | Set 3 | Set 4 | Set 5 | Total |
|---|---|---|---|---|---|---|---|---|---|---|
| 22 Oct | 17:00 | Japan | 0–3 | Iran | 19–25 | 13–25 | 17–25 | | | 49–75 |

== Final standing ==
| Rank | Team |
|---|---|
| 1st place, gold medalist(s) | Iran |
| 2nd place, silver medalist(s) | Japan |
| 3rd place, bronze medalist(s) | India |
| 4 | China |
| 5 | Chinese Taipei |
| 6 | Thailand |
| 7 | Sri Lanka |
| 8 | Australia |
| 9 | Kazakhstan |
| 10 | Kuwait |
| 11 | Maldives |

| Qualified for the 2009 FIVB Youth World Championship |

2008 Asian Youth Boys champions

Iran
Fourth title

Team Roster
Farhad Salafzoun, Saeid Shiroud, Amir Ghafour, Armin Sadeghiani, Saman Faezi, Pouria Fayazi, Mohammad Reza Hosseini, Hamed Bagherpour, Mojtaba Mirzajanpour, Sajjad Dehnavi, Hamed Tariverdi, Mohammad Hashem Hosseini
Head Coach: Jovica Cvetković

== Awards ==
- MVP: (Iran) Farhad Salafzoun
- Best scorer: (Iran) Pouria Fayazi
- Best spiker: (China) Dai Qingyao
- Best blocker: (Iran) Saman Faezi
- Best server: (China) Song Jianwei
- Best setter: (Japan) Kosuke Tomonaga
- Best libero: (Japan) Taiki Tsuruda
