= 2001 Asian Youth Men's Volleyball Championship =

Tournament details
- Host country: Iran
- Dates: 1–8 March
- Teams: 10
- Venue: 1 (in 1 host city)

Final positions
- Champions: Iran (1st title)

Tournament awards
- MVP: (Iran) Mohammad Soleimani

The 2001 Asian Youth Men's Volleyball Championship was held at the Mellat Sport Complex, Isfahan, Iran from 1 to 8 March 2001.

== Pools composition ==
The teams were seeded based on their final ranking at the 1999 Asian Youth Boys Volleyball Championship.

Pool A	Pool B
Iran (Host); China (3rd); Chinese Taipei; Qatar; Australia	South Korea (1st); Japan (2nd); North Korea; Saudi Arabia; India

== Preliminary round ==
=== Pool A ===
Pos	Team	Pld	W	L	Pts	SW	SL	SR	SPW	SPL	SPR	Qualification
1	Iran	4	4	0	8	12	2	6.000	356	290	1.228	Quarterfinals
2	China	4	3	1	7	10	4	2.500	347	297	1.168	Quarterfinals
3	Chinese Taipei	4	2	2	6	7	6	1.167	294	292	1.007	Quarterfinals
4	Qatar	4	1	3	5	3	10	0.300	272	311	0.875	Quarterfinals
5	Australia	4	0	4	4	2	12	0.167	270	349	0.774	

Date		Score		Set 1	Set 2	Set 3	Set 4	Set 5	Total
01 Mar	Australia	0–3	Chinese Taipei	22–25	21–25	17–25			60–75
01 Mar	Iran	3–1	China	28–26	25–19	27–29	25–22		105–96
02 Mar	Australia	1–3	Qatar	14–25	18–25	25–23	23–25		80–98
02 Mar	Iran	3–1	Chinese Taipei	25–14	24–26	25–17	25–18		99–75
03 Mar	China	3–0	Chinese Taipei	25–23	25–20	25–22			75–65
03 Mar	Iran	3–0	Qatar	27–25	25–22	25–21			77–68
04 Mar	China	3–0	Qatar	25–22	25–16	25–10			75–48
04 Mar	Iran	3–0	Australia	25–22	25–14	25–15			75–51
05 Mar	Chinese Taipei	3–0	Qatar	25–14	25–17	29–27			79–58
05 Mar	Australia	1–3	China	15–25	17–25	28–26	19–25		79–101

=== Pool B ===
Pos	Team	Pld	W	L	Pts	SW	SL	SR	SPW	SPL	SPR	Qualification
1	South Korea	4	4	0	8	12	1	12.000	326	252	1.294	Quarterfinals
2	India	4	3	1	7	9	6	1.500	335	336	0.997	Quarterfinals
3	North Korea	4	2	2	6	9	7	1.286	353	370	0.954	Quarterfinals
4	Japan	4	1	3	5	3	11	0.273	310	337	0.920	Quarterfinals
5	Saudi Arabia	4	0	4	4	4	12	0.333	346	375	0.923	

Date		Score		Set 1	Set 2	Set 3	Set 4	Set 5	Total
01 Mar	Saudi Arabia	1–3	India	23–25	25–23	22–25	18–25		88–98
01 Mar	South Korea	3–0	Japan	25–22	25–21	25–22			75–65
02 Mar	India	0–3	South Korea	16–25	11–25	21–25			48–75
02 Mar	North Korea	3–1	Saudi Arabia	25–20	26–24	17–25	25–23		93–92
03 Mar	Japan	0–3	India	23–25	27–29	19–25			69–79
03 Mar	North Korea	1–3	South Korea	21–25	28–26	19–25	12–25		80–101
04 Mar	Saudi Arabia	0–3	South Korea	13–25	23–25	23–25			59–75
04 Mar	Japan	0–3	North Korea	24–26	22–25	21–25			67–76
05 Mar	India	3–2	North Korea	24–26	25–19	21–25	25–21	15–13	110–104
05 Mar	Saudi Arabia	2–3	Japan	18–25	22–25	25–14	32–30	10–15	107–109

== Classification 9th–10th ==
Date		Score		Set 1	Set 2	Set 3	Set 4	Set 5	Total
06 Mar	Australia	1–3	Saudi Arabia	25–23	18–25	14–25	18–25		75–98

== Final round ==
Quarterfinals
6 March – Isfahan
South Korea	3
Qatar	0
6 March – Isfahan
China	2
North Korea	3
6 March – Isfahan
Iran	3
Japan	1
6 March – Isfahan
India	2
Chinese Taipei	3

Semifinals
7 March – Isfahan
South Korea	3
North Korea	0
7 March – Isfahan
Iran	3
Chinese Taipei	1

Final
8 March – Isfahan
South Korea	1
Iran	3
3rd place
8 March – Isfahan
North Korea	2
Chinese Taipei	3

5th–8th places
7 March – Isfahan
Qatar	1
China	3
7 March – Isfahan
Japan	3
India	0

5th place
8 March – Isfahan
Japan	2
China	3
7th place
8 March – Isfahan
Qatar	1
India	3

=== Quarterfinals ===
Date		Score		Set 1	Set 2	Set 3	Set 4	Set 5	Total
06 Mar	South Korea	3–0	Qatar	25–23	25–20	25–12			75–55
06 Mar	China	2–3	North Korea	25–15	22–25	25–22	23–25	13–15	108–102
06 Mar	Iran	3–1	Japan	25–19	23–25	25–19	25–18		98–81
06 Mar	India	2–3	Chinese Taipei	25–21	25–23	25–27	17–25	13–15	105–111

=== 5th–8th semifinals ===
Date		Score		Set 1	Set 2	Set 3	Set 4	Set 5	Total
07 Mar	Qatar	1–3	China	25–21	22–25	18–25	18–25		83–96
07 Mar	Japan	3–0	India	25–20	25–21	30–28			80–69

=== Semifinals ===
Date		Score		Set 1	Set 2	Set 3	Set 4	Set 5	Total
07 Mar	South Korea	3–0	North Korea	25–19	26–24	25–21			76–64
07 Mar	Iran	3–1	Chinese Taipei	25–18	23–25	25–13	26–24		99–80

=== 7th place ===
Date		Score		Set 1	Set 2	Set 3	Set 4	Set 5	Total
08 Mar	Qatar	1–3	India	18–25	31–29	24–26	22–25		95–105

=== 5th place ===
Date		Score		Set 1	Set 2	Set 3	Set 4	Set 5	Total
08 Mar	Japan	2–3	China	25–23	27–25	26–28	22–25	16–18	116–119

=== 3rd place ===
Date		Score		Set 1	Set 2	Set 3	Set 4	Set 5	Total
08 Mar	North Korea	2–3	Chinese Taipei	24–26	25–20	25–15	15–25	8–15	97–101

=== Final ===
Date		Score		Set 1	Set 2	Set 3	Set 4	Set 5	Total
08 Mar	South Korea	1–3	Iran	18–25	23–25	27–25	23–25		91–100

== Final standing ==
Rank	Team
1st place, gold medalist(s)	Iran
2nd place, silver medalist(s)	South Korea
3rd place, bronze medalist(s)	Chinese Taipei
4	North Korea
5	China
6	Japan
7	India
8	Qatar
9	Saudi Arabia
10	Australia

Qualified for the 2001 FIVB Youth World Championship

2001 Asian Youth Boys champions

Iran
First title

Team Roster

Mohammad Soleimani, Davoud Moghbeli, Shahriar Bahrami, Mohammad Reza Fadaei, Mohsen Andalib, Mahmoud Tavanaei, Rouhollah Kolivand, Behzad Behnejad, Mehdi Mahdavi, Farhad Zarif, Mehdi Farahdoust, Mikaeil Yolmeh

Head Coach: Mostafa Karkhaneh

== Awards ==
- MVP: (Iran) Mohammad Soleimani
- Best scorer: (South Korea) Kang Dong-jin
- Best spiker: (Iran) Mohammad Soleimani
- Best blocker: (Iran) Davoud Moghbeli
- Best server: (South Korea) Kang Dong-jin
- Best setter: (South Korea) Song Byung-il
- Best digger: (Iran) Farhad Zarif
- Best receiver: (Chinese Taipei) Liu Hsiung
