= 2012 Asian Youth Boys' Volleyball Championship =

Tournament details
- Host country: Iran
- Dates: 24 October – 1 November
- Teams: 11
- Venue: 1 (in 1 host city)

Final positions
- Champions: Iran (6th title)

Tournament awards
- MVP: (Iran) Akbar Valaei

The 2012 Asian Youth Boys' Volleyball Championship was held at the Azadi Volleyball Hall, Azadi Sport Complex, Tehran, Iran.

== Pools composition ==
The teams were seeded based on their final ranking at the 2010 Asian Youth Boys Volleyball Championship.

| Pool A | Pool B | Pool C | Pool D |
|---|---|---|---|
| Iran (Host & 1st); Sri Lanka (8th); ~~Mongolia~~ * ~~Kuwait~~ * | China (2nd); Thailand (7th); Kazakhstan | South Korea (3rd); Chinese Taipei (6th); Australia | India (4th); Japan (5th); Turkmenistan |

* Withdrew

== Preliminary round ==
=== Pool A ===
| Pos | Team | Pld | W | L | Pts | SW | SL | SR | SPW | SPL | SPR | Qualification |
|---|---|---|---|---|---|---|---|---|---|---|---|---|
| 1 | Iran | 1 | 1 | 0 | 3 | 3 | 0 | MAX | 75 | 58 | 1.293 | Pool E |
| 2 | Sri Lanka | 1 | 0 | 1 | 0 | 0 | 3 | 0.000 | 58 | 75 | 0.773 | Pool E |

| Date | Time | | Score | | Set 1 | Set 2 | Set 3 | Set 4 | Set 5 | Total | Report |
|---|---|---|---|---|---|---|---|---|---|---|---|
| 25 Oct | 16:00 | Iran | 3–0 | Sri Lanka | 25–22 | 25–18 | 25–18 | | | 75–58 | Report |

=== Pool B ===
| Pos | Team | Pld | W | L | Pts | SW | SL | SR | SPW | SPL | SPR | Qualification |
|---|---|---|---|---|---|---|---|---|---|---|---|---|
| 1 | China | 2 | 2 | 0 | 6 | 6 | 0 | MAX | 155 | 105 | 1.476 | Pool F |
| 2 | Thailand | 2 | 1 | 1 | 3 | 3 | 3 | 1.000 | 139 | 135 | 1.030 | Pool F |
| 3 | Kazakhstan | 2 | 0 | 2 | 0 | 0 | 6 | 0.000 | 96 | 150 | 0.640 | Pool H |

| Date | Time | | Score | | Set 1 | Set 2 | Set 3 | Set 4 | Set 5 | Total | Report |
|---|---|---|---|---|---|---|---|---|---|---|---|
| 24 Oct | 14:00 | Kazakhstan | 0–3 | Thailand | 22–25 | 18–25 | 15–25 | | | 55–75 | Report |
| 25 Oct | 10:00 | China | 3–0 | Kazakhstan | 25–8 | 25–14 | 25–19 | | | 75–41 | Report |
| 26 Oct | 10:00 | Thailand | 0–3 | China | 22–25 | 14–25 | 28–30 | | | 64–80 | Report |

=== Pool C ===
| Pos | Team | Pld | W | L | Pts | SW | SL | SR | SPW | SPL | SPR | Qualification |
|---|---|---|---|---|---|---|---|---|---|---|---|---|
| 1 | South Korea | 2 | 2 | 0 | 6 | 6 | 0 | MAX | 150 | 112 | 1.339 | Pool E |
| 2 | Chinese Taipei | 2 | 1 | 1 | 3 | 3 | 3 | 1.000 | 130 | 132 | 0.985 | Pool E |
| 3 | Australia | 2 | 0 | 2 | 0 | 0 | 6 | 0.000 | 114 | 150 | 0.760 | Pool G |

| Date | Time | | Score | | Set 1 | Set 2 | Set 3 | Set 4 | Set 5 | Total | Report |
|---|---|---|---|---|---|---|---|---|---|---|---|
| 24 Oct | 16:00 | South Korea | 3–0 | Australia | 25–20 | 25–19 | 25–18 | | | 75–57 | Report |
| 25 Oct | 14:00 | Chinese Taipei | 0–3 | South Korea | 10–25 | 22–25 | 23–25 | | | 55–75 | Report |
| 26 Oct | 14:00 | Australia | 0–3 | Chinese Taipei | 16–25 | 22–25 | 19–25 | | | 57–75 | Report |

=== Pool D ===
| Pos | Team | Pld | W | L | Pts | SW | SL | SR | SPW | SPL | SPR | Qualification |
|---|---|---|---|---|---|---|---|---|---|---|---|---|
| 1 | Japan | 2 | 2 | 0 | 6 | 6 | 1 | 6.000 | 174 | 129 | 1.349 | Pool F |
| 2 | India | 2 | 1 | 1 | 3 | 4 | 3 | 1.333 | 144 | 152 | 0.947 | Pool F |
| 3 | Turkmenistan | 2 | 0 | 2 | 0 | 0 | 6 | 0.000 | 113 | 150 | 0.753 | Pool H |

| Date | Time | | Score | | Set 1 | Set 2 | Set 3 | Set 4 | Set 5 | Total | Report |
|---|---|---|---|---|---|---|---|---|---|---|---|
| 24 Oct | 18:00 | India | 3–0 | Turkmenistan | 25–15 | 25–22 | 25–16 | | | 75–53 | Report |
| 25 Oct | 18:00 | Japan | 3–1 | India | 24–26 | 25–19 | 25–13 | 25–11 | | 99–69 | Report |
| 26 Oct | 16:00 | Turkmenistan | 0–3 | Japan | 21–25 | 19–25 | 20–25 | | | 60–75 | Report |

== Classification round ==
- The results and the points of the matches between the same teams that were already played during the preliminary round were taken into account for the classification round.

=== Pool E ===
| Pos | Team | Pld | W | L | Pts | SW | SL | SR | SPW | SPL | SPR | Qualification |
|---|---|---|---|---|---|---|---|---|---|---|---|---|
| 1 | Iran | 3 | 3 | 0 | 9 | 9 | 1 | 9.000 | 242 | 179 | 1.352 | Quarterfinals |
| 2 | South Korea | 3 | 2 | 1 | 6 | 7 | 3 | 2.333 | 227 | 203 | 1.118 | Quarterfinals |
| 3 | Chinese Taipei | 3 | 1 | 2 | 2 | 3 | 8 | 0.375 | 209 | 242 | 0.864 | Quarterfinals |
| 4 | Sri Lanka | 3 | 0 | 3 | 1 | 2 | 9 | 0.222 | 206 | 260 | 0.792 | Quarterfinals |

| Date | Time | | Score | | Set 1 | Set 2 | Set 3 | Set 4 | Set 5 | Total | Report |
|---|---|---|---|---|---|---|---|---|---|---|---|
| 27 Oct | 13:00 | South Korea | 3–0 | Sri Lanka | 25–16 | 25–19 | 25–21 | | | 75–56 | Report |
| 27 Oct | 17:00 | Iran | 3–0 | Chinese Taipei | 25–21 | 25–12 | 25–11 | | | 75–44 | Report |
| 28 Oct | 10:00 | Sri Lanka | 2–3 | Chinese Taipei | 17–25 | 25–23 | 25–22 | 18–25 | 7–15 | 92–110 | Report |
| 28 Oct | 16:00 | Iran | 3–1 | South Korea | 25–14 | 17–25 | 25–20 | 25–18 | | 92–77 | Report |

=== Pool F ===
| Pos | Team | Pld | W | L | Pts | SW | SL | SR | SPW | SPL | SPR | Qualification |
|---|---|---|---|---|---|---|---|---|---|---|---|---|
| 1 | China | 3 | 3 | 0 | 9 | 9 | 0 | MAX | 230 | 177 | 1.299 | Quarterfinals |
| 2 | Japan | 3 | 2 | 1 | 6 | 6 | 4 | 1.500 | 232 | 190 | 1.221 | Quarterfinals |
| 3 | India | 3 | 1 | 2 | 2 | 4 | 8 | 0.500 | 232 | 277 | 0.838 | Quarterfinals |
| 4 | Thailand | 3 | 0 | 3 | 1 | 2 | 9 | 0.222 | 213 | 263 | 0.810 | Quarterfinals |

| Date | Time | | Score | | Set 1 | Set 2 | Set 3 | Set 4 | Set 5 | Total | Report |
|---|---|---|---|---|---|---|---|---|---|---|---|
| 27 Oct | 15:00 | China | 3–0 | India | 25–16 | 25–20 | 25–19 | | | 75–55 | Report |
| 27 Oct | 19:00 | Japan | 3–0 | Thailand | 25–15 | 25–18 | 25–13 | | | 75–46 | Report |
| 28 Oct | 14:00 | Thailand | 2–3 | India | 25–22 | 23–25 | 25–21 | 18–25 | 12–15 | 103–108 | Report |
| 28 Oct | 18:00 | China | 3–0 | Japan | 25–18 | 25–19 | 25–21 | | | 75–58 | Report |

=== Pool G ===
| Pos | Team | Pld | W | L | Pts | SW | SL | SR | SPW | SPL | SPR | Qualification |
|---|---|---|---|---|---|---|---|---|---|---|---|---|
| 1 | Australia | 0 | 0 | 0 | 0 | 0 | 0 | — | 0 | 0 | — | 9th–11th place |

=== Pool H ===
| Pos | Team | Pld | W | L | Pts | SW | SL | SR | SPW | SPL | SPR | Qualification |
|---|---|---|---|---|---|---|---|---|---|---|---|---|
| 1 | Kazakhstan | 1 | 1 | 0 | 2 | 3 | 2 | 1.500 | 104 | 91 | 1.143 | 9th–11th place |
| 2 | Turkmenistan | 1 | 0 | 1 | 1 | 2 | 3 | 0.667 | 91 | 104 | 0.875 | 9th–11th place |

| Date | Time | | Score | | Set 1 | Set 2 | Set 3 | Set 4 | Set 5 | Total | Report |
|---|---|---|---|---|---|---|---|---|---|---|---|
| 27 Oct | 10:00 | Kazakhstan | 3–2 | Turkmenistan | 21–25 | 18–25 | 25–19 | 25–13 | 15–9 | 104–91 | Report |

== Classification 9th–11th ==
9th–11th places
30 October – Tehran
Australia | 3
Turkmenistan | 0
30 October – Tehran
Kazakhstan
Bye

9th place
31 October – Tehran
Australia | 3
Kazakhstan | 0

=== Semifinals ===
| Date | Time | | Score | | Set 1 | Set 2 | Set 3 | Set 4 | Set 5 | Total | Report |
|---|---|---|---|---|---|---|---|---|---|---|---|
| 30 Oct | 10:00 | Australia | 3–0 | Turkmenistan | 25–14 | 25–21 | 25–19 | | | 75–54 | Report |

=== 9th place ===
| Date | Time | | Score | | Set 1 | Set 2 | Set 3 | Set 4 | Set 5 | Total | Report |
|---|---|---|---|---|---|---|---|---|---|---|---|
| 31 Oct | 10:00 | Australia | 3–0 | Kazakhstan | 25–18 | 25–15 | 25–19 | | | 75–52 | Report |

== Final round ==
Quarterfinals
30 October – Tehran
Iran | 3
Thailand | 0
30 October – Tehran
Japan | 3
Chinese Taipei | 0
30 October – Tehran
China | 3
Sri Lanka | 0
30 October – Tehran
South Korea | 3
India | 2

Semifinals
31 October – Tehran
Iran | 3
Japan | 2
31 October – Tehran
China | 3
South Korea | 2

Final
1 November – Tehran
Iran | 3
China | 2
3rd place
1 November – Tehran
Japan | 3
South Korea | 2

5th–8th places
31 October – Tehran
Thailand | 0
Chinese Taipei | 3
31 October – Tehran
Sri Lanka | 3
India | 1

5th place
1 November – Tehran
Chinese Taipei | 3
Sri Lanka | 0
7th place
1 November – Tehran
Thailand | 1
India | 3

=== Quarterfinals ===
| Date | Time | | Score | | Set 1 | Set 2 | Set 3 | Set 4 | Set 5 | Total | Report |
|---|---|---|---|---|---|---|---|---|---|---|---|
| 30 Oct | 13:00 | South Korea | 3–2 | India | 25–21 | 25–15 | 18–25 | 22–25 | 21–19 | 111–105 | Report |
| 30 Oct | 15:00 | China | 3–0 | Sri Lanka | 25–20 | 25–22 | 25–10 | | | 75–52 | Report |
| 30 Oct | 17:00 | Iran | 3–0 | Thailand | 25–11 | 25–16 | 25–23 | | | 75–50 | Report |
| 30 Oct | 19:00 | Japan | 3–0 | Chinese Taipei | 25–16 | 25–21 | 26–24 | | | 76–61 | Report |

=== 5th–8th semifinals ===
| Date | Time | | Score | | Set 1 | Set 2 | Set 3 | Set 4 | Set 5 | Total | Report |
|---|---|---|---|---|---|---|---|---|---|---|---|
| 31 Oct | 12:00 | Thailand | 0–3 | Chinese Taipei | 20–25 | 17–25 | 13–25 | | | 50–75 | Report |
| 31 Oct | 14:00 | Sri Lanka | 3–1 | India | 25–21 | 17–25 | 32–30 | 25–20 | | 99–96 | Report |

=== Semifinals ===
| Date | Time | | Score | | Set 1 | Set 2 | Set 3 | Set 4 | Set 5 | Total | Report |
|---|---|---|---|---|---|---|---|---|---|---|---|
| 31 Oct | 16:00 | Iran | 3–2 | Japan | 29–27 | 23–25 | 23–25 | 25–22 | 15–5 | 115–104 | Report |
| 31 Oct | 18:00 | China | 3–2 | South Korea | 23–25 | 21–25 | 25–18 | 25–13 | 15–8 | 109–89 | Report |

=== 7th place ===
| Date | Time | | Score | | Set 1 | Set 2 | Set 3 | Set 4 | Set 5 | Total | Report |
|---|---|---|---|---|---|---|---|---|---|---|---|
| 01 Nov | 10:00 | Thailand | 1–3 | India | 21–25 | 25–23 | 22–25 | 20–25 | | 88–98 | Report |

=== 5th place ===
| Date | Time | | Score | | Set 1 | Set 2 | Set 3 | Set 4 | Set 5 | Total | Report |
|---|---|---|---|---|---|---|---|---|---|---|---|
| 01 Nov | 12:00 | Chinese Taipei | 3–0 | Sri Lanka | 25–14 | 25–22 | 25–23 | | | 75–59 | Report |

=== 3rd place ===
| Date | Time | | Score | | Set 1 | Set 2 | Set 3 | Set 4 | Set 5 | Total | Report |
|---|---|---|---|---|---|---|---|---|---|---|---|
| 01 Nov | 14:00 | Japan | 3–2 | South Korea | 22–25 | 25–20 | 26–28 | 25–20 | 15–10 | 113–103 | Report |

=== Final ===
| Date | Time | | Score | | Set 1 | Set 2 | Set 3 | Set 4 | Set 5 | Total | Report |
|---|---|---|---|---|---|---|---|---|---|---|---|
| 01 Nov | 16:00 | Iran | 3–2 | China | 21–25 | 25–21 | 23–25 | 28–26 | 15–8 | 112–105 | Report |

== Final standing ==
| Rank | Team |
|---|---|
| 1st place, gold medalist(s) | Iran |
| 2nd place, silver medalist(s) | China |
| 3rd place, bronze medalist(s) | Japan |
| 4 | South Korea |
| 5 | Chinese Taipei |
| 6 | Sri Lanka |
| 7 | India |
| 8 | Thailand |
| 9 | Australia |
| 10 | Kazakhstan |
| 11 | Turkmenistan |

| Qualified for the 2013 FIVB Youth World Championship |

2012 Asian Youth Boys champions

Iran
Sixth title

Team Roster
Javad Hekmati, Hamid Hamoudi, Abbas Jafari, Akbar Valaei, Shahin Shahrouz, Alireza Safaei, Hadi Seyed-Niazi, Sahand Allahverdian, Rahman Taghizadeh, Mohammad Reza Evazpour, Mohammad Javad Manavinejad, Amin Heidari
Head Coach: Iraj Mozaffari

== Awards ==
- MVP: (Iran) Akbar Valaei
- Best scorer: (Japan) Yuki Ishikawa
- Best spiker: (China) Zhang Zhejia
- Best blocker: (Iran) Sahand Allahverdian
- Best server: (Iran) Javad Hekmati
- Best setter: (China) Yu Yaochen
- Best libero: (South Korea) Lee Sang-uk
