= 2026 AVC Boys' U18 Volleyball Championship =

Youth volleyball championship in China

2026亚洲U18男子排球锦标赛 (Chinese); 2026 Yàzhōu U18 Nánzǐ Páiqiú Jǐnbiāosài

Tournament details
- Host country: China
- City: Haikou
- Dates: 12–18 July
- Teams: 16 (from 1 confederation)
- Venue: 2 (in 1 host city)

Final positions
- Champions: Iran (8th title)
- Runners-up: Japan
- Third place: Chinese Taipei
- Fourth place: China

Tournament awards
- MVP: (Iran) Abolfazl Pashaamiri
- Best Setter: (Iran) Amirali Shams
- Best OH: (Chinese Taipei) Chang Wei-hsiu; (Japan) Kaiji Nishimura
- Best MB: (Iran) Pedram Heydari Sefat; (Japan) Haru Sawano
- Best OPP: (Iran) Abolfazl Pashaamiri
- Best Libero: (Japan) Toma Mizobuchi

Tournament statistics
- Matches played: 48
- Attendance: 46,978 (979 per match)

The 2026 AVC Boys' U18 Volleyball Championship was the 16th edition of the AVC Boys' U18 Volleyball Championship, a biennial international volleyball tournament organised by the Asian Volleyball Confederation (AVC) with China Volleyball Association (CVA). The tournament took place at Haikou Wuyuan River Gymnasium in Haikou, China from 12 to 18 July.

This tournament served as the qualification tournament for the FIVB Volleyball Boys' U19 World Championship. The top four teams of the tournament qualified for the 2027 FIVB Volleyball Boys' U19 World Championship as the AVC representatives.

Players must be born on or after 1 January 2009. Asian U18 players who have already played once in the FIVB U19 Championship cannot play in AVC U18 Championship as it is a qualification event for the following year of FIVB U19 event. In principle, the players can participate in the AVC U18 and FIVB U19 only once.

China are the defending champions after beating Iran 3–2 at the final in Manama, Bahrain.

== Host selection ==
The host selection process for the 2026 championship underwent a late venue transition. On December 20, 2025, the Asian Volleyball Confederation (AVC) initially unveiled its international calendar following meetings in Bangkok, announcing Manama, Bahrain, as the official host city. The Bahrain Volleyball Association was originally entrusted with the tournament's operational guidelines, released in January 2026.

However, the hosting rights were later transferred to China. On May 31, 2026, the China Volleyball Association (CVA) opened a public bidding process seeking host cities within China that could meet the tournament's criteria, which included having two competition courts with at least 3,000 seats. Following a comprehensive evaluation of proposals submitted by June 5, 2026, the CVA finalized its bidding procedures with the continental governing body. On June 12, 2026, it was officially confirmed that Haikou, the capital city of Hainan, had secured the hosting rights, designating the Haikou Wuyuanhe Gymnasium as the official competition venue. This marked the first time Hainan would host the continental youth championship.

== Qualification ==
A total of 16 teams qualify for the championship. The Asian Volleyball Confederation (AVC) capped the tournament at 16 entries, utilizing specific qualification criteria to determine the participating nations.

The slot allocation was distributed as follows:

- Host Country: 1 team
- Previous Championship: The top 5 ranked teams from the 2024 edition.
- Zonal Qualification: 10 teams divided equally among the five AVC zonal associations (2 teams per zone). Slots were awarded to either the winners of the respective Zonal Association Cups (ZA Cup) or the next highest-ranking teams in the zonal qualification tournaments.
  - CAVA: 2 teams
  - EAVA: 2 teams
  - OZVA: 2 teams
  - SAVA: 2 teams
  - WAVA: 2 teams

All zonal qualifiers were required to be finalized by 31 May 2026. In the event that a zone failed to enter its allotted teams, the vacancies were to be filled based on the final rankings of the previous continental championship, followed by the FIVB Boys' U19 World Rankings. If no such rankings were available, the respective Zonal President would designate the representative team.

Country	Qualified as	Qualified on	Appearances			Previous best performance
Country	Qualified as	Qualified on	Total	First	Last	Previous best performance
China	2024 Asian U18 Championship champions and host country	2 August 2024	15	1997	2024	Champions (2024)
Iran	2024 Asian U18 Championship runners-up	2 August 2024	13	2001	2024	Champions (2001, 2005, 2007, 2008, 2010, 2012, 2014)
Pakistan	2024 Asian U18 Championship 3rd placers	2 August 2024	3	2018	2024	3rd place (2024)
Japan	2024 Asian U18 Championship 4th placers	2 August 2024	14	1997	2024	Champions (2017, 2018, 2022)
South Korea	2024 Asian U18 Championship 5th placers	4 August 2024	14	1997	2024	Champions (1999)
Thailand	2024 Asian U18 Championship 6th placers (Note: As China had already qualified as host, their slots were reallocated to Thailand.)	4 August 2024	13	1997	2024	5th place (1997, 2003, 2018)
India	CAVA representatives	10 June 2026	12	2001	2024	Champions (2003)
Kazakhstan	CAVA representatives	10 June 2026	7	2008	2024	9th place (2008, 2014)
Kyrgyzstan	CAVA representatives	10 June 2026	1	None		—N/a
Chinese Taipei	EAVA representatives	10 June 2026	15	1997	2024	Champions (1997)
Hong Kong	EAVA representatives	10 June 2026	6	2007	2024	11th place (2007, 2017)
Australia	OZVA representative	10 June 2026	14	1997	2024	6th place (1997, 2003)
Saudi Arabia	WAVA representatives	10 June 2026	5	1999	2024	4th place (1999)
Bahrain	WAVA representatives	10 June 2026	3	2014	2024	7th place (2024)
Indonesia	SAVA representatives	10 June 2026	1	None		—N/a
Philippines	SAVA representatives	10 June 2026	4	1997	2024	8th place (1997, 1999)

== Pools composition ==
The draw of lots was released on 10 June 2026 on Asian Volleyball Confederation YouTube channel. Teams were split into four pools with four teams each.

External videos
- Drawing of Lots: AVC Boy's U18 Volleyball Championship - Haikou 2026

=== Seeding ===
Seeded teams	Pot 1	Pot 2
China (1; Hosts); Iran (2); Pakistan (3); Japan (4); South Korea (5); Thailand (6); Bahrain (7); Chinese Taipei (8)	India (9); Kazakhstan (10); Australia (12); Hong Kong (13)	Saudi Arabia (15); Kyrgyzstan (–); SE.Z1 (Note: The team were not known at the time of the draw. Later known to be Indonesia and the Philippines.); SE.Z2

=== Draw result ===
Pool A	Pool B	Pool C	Pool D
China	Iran	Pakistan	Japan
Chinese Taipei	Bahrain	Thailand	South Korea
Hong Kong	India	Kazakhstan	Australia
Indonesia	Philippines	Kyrgyzstan	Saudi Arabia

== Venue ==
Haikou, China
Haikou Wuyuan River Gymnasium
Capacity: 12,000
Location beside Wuyuan River Stadium in Haikou, Hainan
1 Haikou Wuyuan River Gymnasium

== Pool standing procedure ==
1. Total number of victories (matches won, matches lost)
2. In the event of a tie, the following first tiebreaker will apply: The teams will be ranked by the most point gained per match as follows:
  - Match won 3–0 or 3–1: 3 points for the winner, 0 points for the loser
  - Match won 3–2: 2 points for the winner, 1 point for the loser
  - Match forfeited: 3 points for the winner, 0 points (0–25, 0–25, 0–25) for the loser
3. If teams are still tied after examining the number of victories and points gained, then the AVC will examine the results in order to break the tie in the following order:
  - Set quotient: if two or more teams are tied on the number of points gained, they will be ranked by the quotient resulting from the division of the number of all set won by the number of all sets lost.
  - Points quotient: if the tie persists based on the set quotient, the teams will be ranked by the quotient resulting from the division of all points scored by the total of points lost during all sets.
  - If the tie persists based on the point quotient, the tie will be broken based on the team that won the match of the Round Robin Phase between the tied teams. When the tie in point quotient is between three or more teams, these teams ranked taking into consideration only the matches involving the teams in question.

== Preliminary round ==
- All times are China Standard Time (UTC+08:00).

=== Pool A ===
Pos	Team	Pld	W	L	Pts	SW	SL	SR	SPW	SPL	SPR	Qualification
1	Chinese Taipei	3	3	0	7	9	4	2.250	295	269	1.097	Final eight
2	China (H)	3	2	1	7	8	4	2.000	280	252	1.111	Final eight
3	Indonesia	3	1	2	3	4	6	0.667	237	230	1.030	9th–16th places
4	Hong Kong	3	0	3	1	2	9	0.222	198	259	0.764	9th–16th places

Source: FIVB Live Center
(H) Host

Date	Time	Venue		Score		Set 1	Set 2	Set 3	Set 4	Set 5	Total	Attd	Report
12 July	13:00	Court 1	Chinese Taipei	3–2	Hong Kong	25–16	23–25	25–16	21–25	15–9	109–91	502	P2 Report
12 July	19:00	Court 1	China	3–1	Indonesia	25–23	26–24	21–25	25–20		97–92	8,650	P2 Report
13 July	16:00	Court 1	Indonesia	0–3	Chinese Taipei	30–32	16–25	24–26			70–83	2,640	P2 Report
13 July	19:00	Court 1	China	3–0	Hong Kong	25–18	25–19	25–20			75–57	3,548	P2 Report
14 July	16:00	Court 1	Hong Kong	0–3	Indonesia	16–25	14–25	20–25			50–75	420	P2 Report
14 July	19:00	Court 1	China	2–3	Chinese Taipei	25–20	25–15	26–28	19–25	13–15	108–103	500	P2 Report

=== Pool B ===
Pos	Team	Pld	W	L	Pts	SW	SL	SR	SPW	SPL	SPR	Qualification
1	Iran	3	3	0	9	9	1	9.000	251	185	1.357	Final eight
2	India	3	2	1	5	7	6	1.167	285	283	1.007	Final eight
3	Philippines	3	1	2	4	5	7	0.714	235	261	0.900	9th–16th places
4	Bahrain	3	0	3	0	2	9	0.222	214	256	0.836	9th–16th places

Source: FIVB Live Center

Date	Time	Venue		Score		Set 1	Set 2	Set 3	Set 4	Set 5	Total	Attd	Report
12 July	10:00	Court 1	Bahrain	1–3	India	16–25	25–16	25–27	19–25		85–93	487	P2 Report
12 July	16:00	Court 1	Iran	3–0	Philippines	25–17	25–20	25–13			75–50	1,494	P2 Report
13 July	10:00	Court 1	Iran	3–1	India	29–27	22–25	25–17	25–22		101–91	523	P2 Report
13 July	13:00	Court 1	Philippines	3–1	Bahrain	25–22	13–25	25–23	25–15		88–85	463	P2 Report
14 July	10:00	Court 1	Iran	3–0	Bahrain	25–12	25–18	25–14			75–44	108	P2 Report
14 July	13:00	Court 1	India	3–2	Philippines	16–25	20–25	25–20	25–23	15–4	101–97	150	P2 Report

=== Pool C ===
Pos	Team	Pld	W	L	Pts	SW	SL	SR	SPW	SPL	SPR	Qualification
1	Pakistan	3	3	0	9	9	0	MAX	225	142	1.585	Final eight
2	Thailand	3	2	1	6	6	4	1.500	234	191	1.225	Final eight
3	Kazakhstan	3	1	2	3	4	7	0.571	206	242	0.851	9th–16th places
4	Kyrgyzstan	3	0	3	0	1	9	0.111	158	248	0.637	9th–16th places

Source: FIVB Live Center

Date	Time	Venue		Score		Set 1	Set 2	Set 3	Set 4	Set 5	Total	Attd	Report
12 July	10:30	Court 2	Thailand	3–1	Kazakhstan	23–25	25–16	25–16	25–16		98–73	612	P2 Report
12 July	16:30	Court 2	Pakistan	3–0	Kyrgyzstan	25–10	25–19	25–17			75–46	747	P2 Report
13 July	10:30	Court 2	Pakistan	3–0	Kazakhstan	25–14	25–12	25–9			75–35	60	P2 Report
13 July	16:30	Court 2	Kyrgyzstan	0–3	Thailand	11–25	16–25	16–25			43–75	90	P2 Report
14 July	10:30	Court 2	Pakistan	3–0	Thailand	25–19	25–19	25–23			75–61	110	P2 Report
14 July	19:30	Court 2	Kazakhstan	3–1	Kyrgyzstan	25–16	25–12	23–25	25–16		98–69	410	P2 Report

=== Pool D ===
Pos	Team	Pld	W	L	Pts	SW	SL	SR	SPW	SPL	SPR	Qualification
1	Japan	3	3	0	9	9	0	MAX	225	126	1.786	Final eight
2	South Korea	3	2	1	6	6	3	2.000	210	169	1.243	Final eight
3	Saudi Arabia	3	1	2	3	3	7	0.429	202	241	0.838	9th–16th places
4	Australia	3	0	3	0	1	9	0.111	171	252	0.679	9th–16th places

Source: FIVB Live Center

Date	Time	Venue		Score		Set 1	Set 2	Set 3	Set 4	Set 5	Total	Attd	Report
12 July	13:30	Court 2	South Korea	3–0	Australia	25–15	25–10	25–17			75–42	529	P2 Report
12 July	19:30	Court 2	Japan	3–0	Saudi Arabia	25–16	25–21	25–11			75–48	370	P2 Report
13 July	13:30	Court 2	South Korea	3–0	Saudi Arabia	25–21	25–18	25–13			75–52	60	P2 Report
13 July	19:30	Court 2	Japan	3–0	Australia	25–15	25–16	25–7			75–38	280	P2 Report
14 July	13:30	Court 2	Australia	1–3	Saudi Arabia	28–26	24–26	21–25	18–25		91–102	95	P2 Report
14 July	16:30	Court 2	Japan	3–0	South Korea	25–17	25–23	25–20			75–60	350	P2 Report

== Final round ==
- All times are China Standard Time (UTC+08:00).

=== 9th–16th places ===
13th place match
18 July
Kyrgyzstan	3
Kazakhstan	0
15th place match
18 July
Saudi Arabia	3
Australia	1

13th–16th semifinals
17 July
Kyrgyzstan	3
Saudi Arabia	0
17 July
Australia	1
Kazakhstan	3

9th–16th quarterfinals
16 July
Indonesia	3
Kyrgyzstan	0
16 July
Saudi Arabia	0
Bahrain	3
16 July
Philippines	3
Australia	0
16 July
Kazakhstan	0
Hong Kong	3

9th–12th semifinals
17 July
Indonesia	3
Bahrain	0
17 July
Philippines	3
Hong Kong	0

9th place match
18 July
Indonesia	3
Philippines	1
11th place match
18 July
Bahrain	2
Hong Kong	3

==== 9th–16th quarterfinals ====
Date	Time	Venue		Score		Set 1	Set 2	Set 3	Set 4	Set 5	Total	Attd	Report
16 July	10:30	Court 2	Indonesia	3–0	Kyrgyzstan	25–23	25–19	25–13			75–55	280	P2 Report
16 July	13:30	Court 2	Saudi Arabia	0–3	Bahrain	16–25	15–25	20–25			51–75	60	P2 Report
16 July	16:30	Court 2	Philippines	3–0	Australia	25–20	30–28	25–20			80–68	460	P2 Report
16 July	19:30	Court 2	Kazakhstan	0–3	Hong Kong	22–25	22–25	20–25			64–75	385	P2 Report

==== 13th–16th semifinals ====
Date	Time	Venue		Score		Set 1	Set 2	Set 3	Set 4	Set 5	Total	Attd	Report
17 July	10:30	Court 2	Kyrgyzstan	3–0	Saudi Arabia	25–17	32–30	25–19			82–66	295	P2 Report
17 July	13:30	Court 2	Australia	1–3	Kazakhstan	11–25	25–27	25–22	22–25		83–99	265	P2 Report

==== 9th–12th semifinals ====
Date	Time	Venue		Score		Set 1	Set 2	Set 3	Set 4	Set 5	Total	Attd	Report
17 July	16:30	Court 2	Indonesia	3–0	Bahrain	25–16	25–18	25–23			75–57	380	P2 Report
17 July	19:30	Court 2	Philippines	3–0	Hong Kong	25–18	28–26	25–13			78–57	410	P2 Report

==== 15th place match ====
Date	Time	Venue		Score		Set 1	Set 2	Set 3	Set 4	Set 5	Total	Attd	Report
18 July	10:00	Court 2	Saudi Arabia	3–1	Australia	25–23	19–25	25–23	25–22		94–93	600	P2 Report

==== 13th place match ====
Date	Time	Venue		Score		Set 1	Set 2	Set 3	Set 4	Set 5	Total	Attd	Report
18 July	13:00	Court 2	Kyrgyzstan	3–0	Kazakhstan	25–18	25–20	25–14			75–52	400	P2 Report

==== 11th place match ====
Date	Time	Venue		Score		Set 1	Set 2	Set 3	Set 4	Set 5	Total	Attd	Report
18 July	16:00	Court 2	Bahrain	2–3	Hong Kong	13–25	25–21	25–23	18–25	15–17	96–111	630	P2 Report

==== 9th place match ====
Date	Time	Venue		Score		Set 1	Set 2	Set 3	Set 4	Set 5	Total	Attd	Report
18 July	19:00	Court 2	Indonesia	3–1	Philippines	23–25	25–18	25–15	25–14		98–72	180	P2 Report

=== Final eight ===
5th place match
18 July
Thailand	2
Pakistan	3
7th place match
18 July
India	0
South Korea	3

5th–8th semifinals
17 July
Thailand	3
India	1
17 July
South Korea	1
Pakistan	3

Quarterfinals
16 July
Chinese Taipei	3
Thailand	1
16 July
Japan	3
India	2
16 July
Iran	3
South Korea	1
16 July
Pakistan	2
China	3

Semifinals
17 July
Chinese Taipei	0
Japan	3
17 July
Iran	3
China	2

Final
18 July
Japan	1
Iran	3
3rd place match
18 July
Chinese Taipei	3
China	2

==== Quarterfinals ====
Date	Time	Venue		Score		Set 1	Set 2	Set 3	Set 4	Set 5	Total	Attd	Report
16 July	10:00	Court 1	Japan	3–2	India	25–17	14–25	20–25	25–22	15–10	99–99	850	P2 Report
16 July	13:00	Court 1	Iran	3–1	South Korea	25–19	25–19	11–25	25–18		86–81	105	P2 Report
16 July	16:00	Court 1	Pakistan	2–3	China	25–23	25–22	18–25	22–25	14–16	104–111	1,680	P2 Report
16 July	19:00	Court 1	Chinese Taipei	3–1	Thailand	25–18	32–30	22–25	25–22		104–95	815	P2 Report

==== 5th–8th semifinals ====
Date	Time	Venue		Score		Set 1	Set 2	Set 3	Set 4	Set 5	Total	Attd	Report
17 July	10:00	Court 1	South Korea	1–3	Pakistan	17–25	23–25	25–19	16–25		81–94	455	P2 Report
17 July	13:00	Court 1	Thailand	3–1	India	25–15	25–19	17–25	25–15		92–74	650	P2 Report

==== Semifinals ====
Date	Time	Venue		Score		Set 1	Set 2	Set 3	Set 4	Set 5	Total	Attd	Report
17 July	16:00	Court 1	Iran	3–2	China	18–25	25–14	25–21	23–25	15–11	106–96	2,650	P2 Report
17 July	19:00	Court 1	Chinese Taipei	0–3	Japan	24–26	16–25	19–25			59–76	1,100	P2 Report

==== 7th place match ====
Date	Time	Venue		Score		Set 1	Set 2	Set 3	Set 4	Set 5	Total	Attd	Report
18 July	11:00	Court 1	India	0–3	South Korea	19–25	18–25	20–25			57–75	1,050	P2 Report

==== 5th place match ====
Date	Time	Venue		Score		Set 1	Set 2	Set 3	Set 4	Set 5	Total	Attd	Report
18 July	14:00	Court 1	Thailand	2–3	Pakistan	25–17	26–28	21–25	25–18	12–15	109–103	880	P2 Report

==== 3rd place match ====
Date	Time	Venue		Score		Set 1	Set 2	Set 3	Set 4	Set 5	Total	Attd	Report
18 July	17:00	Court 1	Chinese Taipei	3–2	China	20–25	25–23	14–25	25–21	15–13	99–107	5,000	P2 Report

==== Final ====
Date	Time	Venue		Score		Set 1	Set 2	Set 3	Set 4	Set 5	Total	Attd	Report
18 July	20:00	Court 1	Japan	1–3	Iran	25–23	22–25	17–25	22–25		86–98	4,200	P2 Report

== Final standing ==
Rank	Team
1st place, gold medalist(s)	Iran
2nd place, silver medalist(s)	Japan
3rd place, bronze medalist(s)	Chinese Taipei
4	China
5	Pakistan
6	Thailand
7	South Korea
8	India
9	Indonesia
10	Philippines
11	Hong Kong
12	Bahrain
13	Kyrgyzstan
14	Kazakhstan
15	Saudi Arabia
16	Australia

Qualified for the 2027 U19 World Championship and 2028 U18 Volleyball Championship
Qualified for the 2027 U19 World Championship
Qualified for the 2027 U19 World Championship as host

2026 AVC Boys' U18 champions

Iran
Eight title

14–man roster
Amirreza Hosseinzadehbosra, Amir Mohammad Hemmati, Aydin Chodarkhoei, Benyamin Olfat, Ali Reza Valaei Oryani, Arash Ghahremani, Abolfazl Pashaamiri, Milad Salaritoumaj, Nima Piri, Kamyab Abdollahifar, Ali Sheikhzadeh, Sajjad Asadidarounkola, Amirali Shams, Pedram Heydari Sefat
Head coach
Abdolreza Alizadeh Ghiloo

== Awards ==
- Most valuable player
  Abolfazl Pashaamiri (IRI)
- Best setter
  Amirali Shams (IRI)
- Best outside spikers
  Chang Wei-hsiu (TPE)
  Kaiji Nishimura (JPN)
- Best middle blockers
  Pedram Heydari Sefat (IRI)
  Haru Sawano (JPN)
- Best opposite spiker
  Abolfazl Pashaamiri (IRI)
- Best libero
  Toma Mizobuchi (JPN)

== Qualified teams for FIVB U19 World Championship ==
The following teams from the AVC qualified for the 2027 FIVB Boys' U19 World Championship.

Team	Qualified on	Previous appearances in the FIVB U19 World Championship^{1}
Japan	16 July 2026	13 (1989, 1991, 1993, 1995, 1997, 1999, 2009, 2013, 2015, 2017, 2019, 2023, 2025)
Iran	16 July 2026	15 (1989, 1997, 2001, 2003, 2005, **2007**, 2009, 2011, 2013, 2015, **2017**, 2019, 2021, 2023, 2025)
China	16 July 2026	8 (1999, 2003, 2007, 2011, 2013, 2015, 2017, 2025)
Chinese Taipei	16 July 2026	5 (1995, 1997, 2001, 2015, 2019)

^{1} Bold indicates champions for that year.

== See also ==
- 2026 AVC Men's Volleyball Continental Championship
- 2026 AVC Men's Volleyball Cup
