= Japan men's national under-19 volleyball team =

Japan
- Association: Japan Volleyball Association
- Confederation: AVC

Uniforms
Home	Away	Third

Youth Olympic Games
- Appearances: No Appearances

FIVB U19 World Championship
- Appearances: 13 (First in 1989)
- Best result: (silver) Runners-Up: (1993)

Asian U18 Championship
- Appearances: 12 (First in 1997)
- Best result: (gold) Gold: (2017, 2018).

The Japan men's national under-19 volleyball team represents Japan in men's under-19 volleyball events, it is controlled and managed by the Japanese Volleyball Association that is a member of Asian volleyball body Asian Volleyball Confederation (AVC) and the international volleyball body government the Fédération Internationale de Volleyball (FIVB).

== Results ==
=== Summer Youth Olympics ===
Champions Runners up Third place Fourth place

Youth Olympic Games
Year	Round	Position	Pld	W	L	SW	SL	Squad
(Singapore) 2010	Didn't Qualify							
(China) 2014	No Volleyball Event							
(Argentina) 2018	No Volleyball Event							
Total	0 Titles	0/1						

=== FIVB U19 World Championship ===
Champions Runners up Third place Fourth place

FIVB U19 World Championship
Year	Round	Position	Pld	W	L	SW	SL	Squad
(United Arab Emirates) 1989		7th place						
(Portugal) 1991		6th place						
(Turkey) 1993		Runners-Up						
(Puerto Rico) 1995		Third place						
(Iran) 1997		Third place						
(Saudi Arabia) 1999		9th place						
(Egypt) 2001	Didn't Qualify							
(Thailand) 2003	Didn't Qualify							
(Algeria) 2005	Didn't Qualify							
(Mexico) 2007	Didn't Qualify							
(Italy) 2009		14th place						
(Argentina) 2011	Didn't Qualify							
(Mexico) 2013		17th place						
(Argentina) 2015		15th place						Squad
(Bahrain) 2017		Third place						Squad
(Tunisia) 2019		6th place						Squad
(Iran) 2021	Withdrew							
(Argentina) 2023		11th place						
(Uzbekistan) 2025		16th place						
Total	0 Titles	13/19						

=== Asian Boys' U18 Volleyball Championship ===
Champions Runners up Third place Fourth place

Asian Boys' U18 Championship
Year	Round	Position	Pld	W	L	SW	SL	Squad
(Philippines) 1997		Third place						
(Taiwan) 1999		Runners-up						
(Iran) 2001		6th place						
(India) 2003	Withdrew							
(Iran) 2005		5th place						
(Malaysia) 2007		5th place						
(Sri Lanka) 2008		Runners-up						
(Iran) 2010		5th place						
(Iran) 2012		Third place						
(Sri Lanka) 2014		Runners-up						
(Myanmar) 2017		Champion						
(Iran) 2018		Champion						
(Iran) 2020	Canceled							
(Iran) 2022		Champion						
(Bahrain) 2024		4th place						
Total	3 Titles	12/14						

== Team ==
=== Current squad ===
The following is the roster in the 2023 FIVB Volleyball Boys' U19 World Championship.
Head coach: (Japan) Hiroyuki Takeuchi

No.	Name	Position	Date of birth	Height	Weight	Spike	Block	2023 club
1	Hyo Yamashita	MB	1 February 2005	1.97 m (6 ft 6 in)	85 kg (187 lb)	—N/a	—N/a	(Japan) University of Tsukuba
3	Haruki Matsui	MB	10 April 2005	1.99 m (6 ft 6 in)	—N/a	—N/a	—N/a	(Japan) Aichi Gakuin University
4	Ryugi Takata	MB	28 June 2005	1.98 m (6 ft 6 in)	103.4 kg (228 lb)	327 cm (129 in)	—N/a	(Japan) Nippon Sport Science University
6	Ota Yoshihara	S	24 June 2005	1.83 m (6 ft 0 in)	72 kg (159 lb)	—N/a	—N/a	(Japan) Tokai University
7	Tomorou Fujiyama	OH	20 June 2005	1.88 m (6 ft 2 in)	74 kg (163 lb)	342 cm (135 in)	—N/a	(Japan) Nippon Sport Science University
8	Yuri Moriuchi	S	12 January 2005	1.84 m (6 ft 0 in)	79 kg (174 lb)	—N/a	—N/a	(Japan) Nihon University
9	Haruto Taniguchi	OH	28 January 2005	1.84 m (6 ft 0 in)	90 kg (200 lb)	—N/a	—N/a	(Japan) Nihon University
10	Koshi Yamaguchi	OP	18 February 2005	1.81 m (5 ft 11 in)	69 kg (152 lb)	—N/a	—N/a	(Japan) Fukuyama Heisei University
12	Hiyori Fujita	S	20 January 2005	1.8 m (5 ft 11 in)	70 kg (150 lb)	320 cm (130 in)	—N/a	(Japan) Ryukoku University
14	Takeru Watanabe	MB	6 March 2005	1.89 m (6 ft 2 in)	71 kg (157 lb)	—N/a	—N/a	(Japan) Meiji University
16	Shuji Yoshihara	OH	17 January 2005	1.81 m (5 ft 11 in)	73 kg (161 lb)	325 cm (128 in)	—N/a	(Japan) Kokushikan University
20	Shusei Shiotsuka	L	13 July 2005	1.68 m (5 ft 6 in)	74 kg (163 lb)	—N/a	—N/a	—N/a

=== Notable players ===
- Yuki Ishikawa (2012–2013)
- Kentaro Takahashi (2012–2013)
- Taishi Onodera (2012–2013)
- Masaki Oya (2012–2013)
- Issei Otake (2013)
- Kenta Takanashi (2015)
- Yuji Nishida (2017)
- Tatsunori Otsuka (2017)
- Kento Miyaura (2017–2018)

== See also ==
- Japan men's national under-19 volleyball team
- Japan women's national under-20 volleyball team
- Japan men's national under-21 volleyball team
- Japan men's national volleyball team
