= 2015 FIVB Volleyball Boys' U19 World Championship squads =

This article shows the rosters of all participating teams at the Boys' U19 World Championship 2015 in Argentina.

== Pool A ==
Captain
Libero

=== United States ===
The following is the American roster in the 2015 FIVB Volleyball Boys' U19 World Championship.

Head Coach: Ken Shibuya

No.	Name	Date of birth	Height	Weight	Spike	Block	2015 club
2	Kyle Ensing	6 March 1997	1.98 m (6 ft 6 in)	92 kg (203 lb)	320 cm (130 in)	310 cm (120 in)	(United States) Bones
4	Reese Devilbiss	7 November 1997	1.87 m (6 ft 2 in)	95 kg (209 lb)	320 cm (130 in)	310 cm (120 in)	(United States) Yorketowne VBC
5	Noah Dyer	10 December 1997	1.98 m (6 ft 6 in)	77 kg (170 lb)	328 cm (129 in)	315 cm (124 in)	(United States) Balboa Bay
6	George Huhmann	17 October 1997	2.11 m (6 ft 11 in)	84 kg (185 lb)	340 cm (130 in)	325 cm (128 in)	(United States) St. Louis High Performance
9	Micah Maʻa	16 April 1997	1.92 m (6 ft 4 in)	84 kg (185 lb)	323 cm (127 in)	307 cm (121 in)	(United States) Pacific Rim VB Academy
10	Joshua Tuaniga (C)	18 March 1997	1.91 m (6 ft 3 in)	104 kg (229 lb)	305 cm (120 in)	292 cm (115 in)	(United States) Huntington Beach Club
12	Scott Stadick	15 January 1998	2.13 m (7 ft 0 in)	86 kg (190 lb)	348 cm (137 in)	345 cm (136 in)	(United States) Milwaukee Sting
13	Michael Wexter	2 September 1997	2.04 m (6 ft 8 in)	100 kg (220 lb)	345 cm (136 in)	323 cm (127 in)	(United States) Ultimate
14	Torey Defalco	10 April 1997	1.96 m (6 ft 5 in)	86 kg (190 lb)	348 cm (137 in)	335 cm (132 in)	(United States) Cal State-Long Beach
15	Branden Oberender	31 March 1997	2.03 m (6 ft 8 in)	79 kg (174 lb)	328 cm (129 in)	300 cm (120 in)	(United States) Bones
17	Joseph Worsley	16 June 1997	1.85 m (6 ft 1 in)	79 kg (174 lb)	307 cm (121 in)	290 cm (110 in)	(United States) Pacific Rim VB Academy
19	Jordan Ewert	18 March 1997	1.96 m (6 ft 5 in)	85 kg (187 lb)	320 cm (130 in)	295 cm (116 in)	(United States) Pacific Rim VB Academy

=== Argentina ===
The following is the Argentinean roster in the 2015 FIVB Volleyball Boys' U19 World Championship.

Head Coach: Luis Testa

No.	Name	Date of birth	Height	Weight	Spike	Block	2015 club
3	Jan Martinez Franchi	28 January 1998	1.91 m (6 ft 3 in)	81 kg (179 lb)	330 cm (130 in)	315 cm (124 in)	(Argentina) Club Ciudad de Buenos Aires
4	Sergio Soria	20 April 1997	1.96 m (6 ft 5 in)	90 kg (200 lb)	335 cm (132 in)	315 cm (124 in)	(Argentina) Club Ciudad de Buenos Aires
5	Rodrigo Michelon	17 August 1998	1.82 m (6 ft 0 in)	72 kg (159 lb)	320 cm (130 in)	300 cm (120 in)	(Argentina) Club Atletico Boca Juniors
6	Ramiro Gazzaniga	8 April 1997	1.78 m (5 ft 10 in)	81 kg (179 lb)	305 cm (120 in)	290 cm (110 in)	(Argentina) Club Nautico Avellaneda
7	Matias Giraudo	13 March 1998	1.96 m (6 ft 5 in)	85 kg (187 lb)	330 cm (130 in)	315 cm (124 in)	(Argentina) Club Rivadavia
9	Felipe Benavidez (C)	31 January 1997	1.92 m (6 ft 4 in)	83 kg (183 lb)	330 cm (130 in)	302 cm (119 in)	(Argentina) Club de Amigos
10	Liam Arreche	30 December 1997	1.94 m (6 ft 4 in)	92 kg (203 lb)	339 cm (133 in)	320 cm (130 in)	(Argentina) Club de Amigos
11	Juan Bucciarelli	26 November 1997	1.93 m (6 ft 4 in)	86 kg (190 lb)	336 cm (132 in)	315 cm (124 in)	(Argentina) CO.DE.BA
12	Manuel Balague	12 August 1998	1.90 m (6 ft 3 in)	85 kg (187 lb)	332 cm (131 in)	317 cm (125 in)	(Argentina) Club Villa Dora
13	Agustín Loser	12 October 1997	1.93 m (6 ft 4 in)	77 kg (170 lb)	335 cm (132 in)	310 cm (120 in)	(Argentina) Club Ciudad de Buenos Aires
14	Jose Graffigna	14 August 1997	1.86 m (6 ft 1 in)	78 kg (172 lb)	327 cm (129 in)	305 cm (120 in)	(Argentina) Banco Hispano
15	Ignacio Roberts	28 May 1997	1.82 m (6 ft 0 in)	78 kg (172 lb)	315 cm (124 in)	295 cm (116 in)	(Argentina) Club Ciudad de Buenos Aires

=== Turkey ===
The following is the Turkish roster in the 2015 FIVB Volleyball Boys' U19 World Championship.

Head Coach: Salih Erdogan Tavaci

No.	Name	Date of birth	Height	Weight	Spike	Block	2015 club
1	Ali Onur Edis	18 January 1997	1.97 m (6 ft 6 in)	85 kg (187 lb)	328 cm (129 in)	318 cm (125 in)	(Turkey) Beşiktaş
2	Muzaffer Yönet (C)	18 June 1997	1.90 m (6 ft 3 in)	70 kg (150 lb)	318 cm (125 in)	300 cm (120 in)	(Turkey) Arkas
4	Ogulcan Yatgin	28 April 1997	1.97 m (6 ft 6 in)	87 kg (192 lb)	320 cm (130 in)	309 cm (122 in)	(Turkey) Fenerbahçe
6	Çam Abdullah	30 March 1997	1.95 m (6 ft 5 in)	80 kg (180 lb)	316 cm (124 in)	300 cm (120 in)	(Turkey) Halkbank
9	Halil Ibrahim Kurt	16 February 1998	2.03 m (6 ft 8 in)	90 kg (200 lb)	323 cm (127 in)	311 cm (122 in)	(Turkey) Fenerbahçe
10	Özgür Türkmen	22 January 1998	1.90 m (6 ft 3 in)	75 kg (165 lb)	325 cm (128 in)	312 cm (123 in)	(Turkey) Galatasaray
11	Ugur Kilinç	24 January 1997	2.02 m (6 ft 8 in)	95 kg (209 lb)	325 cm (128 in)	315 cm (124 in)	(Turkey) Arkas
12	Burakhan Tosun	17 January 1998	2.02 m (6 ft 8 in)	93 kg (205 lb)	335 cm (132 in)	316 cm (124 in)	(Turkey) Fenerbahçe
14	Berkay Bayraktar	3 July 1998	1.90 m (6 ft 3 in)	76 kg (168 lb)	320 cm (130 in)	310 cm (120 in)	(Turkey) Tofaş
15	Adis Lagumdzija	19 March 1999	2.04 m (6 ft 8 in)	96 kg (212 lb)	330 cm (130 in)	310 cm (120 in)	(Turkey) Galatasaray
16	Furkan Cöne	22 March 1997	1.80 m (5 ft 11 in)	68 kg (150 lb)	310 cm (120 in)	295 cm (116 in)	(Turkey) Istanbul Büyüksehir Belediye
19	Oguzhan Dogruluk	1 January 1998	1.98 m (6 ft 6 in)	90 kg (200 lb)	325 cm (128 in)	310 cm (120 in)	(Turkey) Ziraat Bankası

=== France ===
The following is the French roster in the 2015 FIVB Volleyball Boys' U19 World Championship.

Head Coach: Olivier Audabram

No.	Name	Date of birth	Height	Weight	Spike	Block	2015 club
1	Barthélémy Chinenyeze	28 February 1998	2.00 m (6 ft 7 in)	80 kg (180 lb)	345 cm (136 in)	320 cm (130 in)	(France) Dunkerque GL VB
4	Toky Rojoharivelo	4 May 1997	1.90 m (6 ft 3 in)	90 kg (200 lb)	333 cm (131 in)	314 cm (124 in)	(France) US St Egrevoise
7	Luc Parville	22 May 1997	1.70 m (5 ft 7 in)	65 kg (143 lb)	310 cm (120 in)	295 cm (116 in)	(France) Tourcoing VB LM
8	Joachim Panou (C)	27 August 1997	1.98 m (6 ft 6 in)	89 kg (196 lb)	345 cm (136 in)	318 cm (125 in)	(France) US Mulhousienne
11	Thibaut Thoral	3 January 1997	1.92 m (6 ft 4 in)	85 kg (187 lb)	340 cm (130 in)	315 cm (124 in)	(France) Tourcoing VB LM
12	Fran Novotni	22 February 1997	1.97 m (6 ft 6 in)	84 kg (185 lb)	345 cm (136 in)	324 cm (128 in)	(France) Nice VB
13	Killian Weidner	17 April 1997	2.03 m (6 ft 8 in)	88 kg (194 lb)	335 cm (132 in)	314 cm (124 in)	(France) Arago de Sète
14	Benjamin Diez	4 April 1998	1.83 m (6 ft 0 in)	75 kg (165 lb)	325 cm (128 in)	305 cm (120 in)	(France) AS Cannes
15	Léo Meyer	25 January 1997	1.94 m (6 ft 4 in)	83 kg (183 lb)	340 cm (130 in)	315 cm (124 in)	(France) US Mulhousienne
16	Mathieu Manusauaki	14 November 1997	1.94 m (6 ft 4 in)	102 kg (225 lb)	345 cm (136 in)	320 cm (130 in)	(France) SA Mérignac
19	Titouan Halle	22 February 1998	1.94 m (6 ft 4 in)	81 kg (179 lb)	340 cm (130 in)	315 cm (124 in)	(France) Rennes EC
20	Léo Chevalier	11 January 1997	1.93 m (6 ft 4 in)	85 kg (187 lb)	345 cm (136 in)	320 cm (130 in)	(France) Montpellier

=== Belgium ===
The following is the Belgian roster in the 2015 FIVB Volleyball Boys' U19 World Championship.

Head Coach: Joel Banks

No.	Name	Date of birth	Height	Weight	Spike	Block	2015 club
1	Ruben Duwaerts	25 July 1997	1.86 m (6 ft 1 in)	78 kg (172 lb)	330 cm (130 in)	300 cm (120 in)	(Belgium) Mendo Booischot
2	Tim Lemant	6 July 1997	2.02 m (6 ft 8 in)	86 kg (190 lb)	337 cm (133 in)	310 cm (120 in)	(Belgium) TSV Vilvoorde
3	Simon Peeters (C)	28 April 1997	1.92 m (6 ft 4 in)	80 kg (180 lb)	340 cm (130 in)	305 cm (120 in)	(Belgium) TSV Vilvoorde
5	Lou Kindt	25 May 1997	2.02 m (6 ft 8 in)	85 kg (187 lb)	349 cm (137 in)	324 cm (128 in)	(Belgium) TSV Vilvoorde
6	Bert Dufraing	5 September 1998	1.91 m (6 ft 3 in)	69 kg (152 lb)	335 cm (132 in)	305 cm (120 in)	(Belgium) TSV Vilvoorde
7	Menno Van De Velde	21 February 1997	2.03 m (6 ft 8 in)	84 kg (185 lb)	340 cm (130 in)	313 cm (123 in)	(Belgium) TSV Vilvoorde
8	Bjarne Van De Velde	18 April 1997	2.00 m (6 ft 7 in)	82 kg (181 lb)	338 cm (133 in)	312 cm (123 in)	(Belgium) TSV Vilvoorde
10	Thomas Pardon	10 March 1998	2.03 m (6 ft 8 in)	87 kg (192 lb)	345 cm (136 in)	312 cm (123 in)	(Belgium) TSV Vilvoorde
11	Tybo Engelschenschilt	18 January 1997	1.86 m (6 ft 1 in)	76 kg (168 lb)	318 cm (125 in)	301 cm (119 in)	(Belgium) VDK Gent Heren
13	Florian Malisse	14 December 1997	1.91 m (6 ft 3 in)	82 kg (181 lb)	329 cm (130 in)	297 cm (117 in)	(Belgium) TSV Vilvoorde
14	Tim Verstraete	1 February 1999	1.73 m (5 ft 8 in)	68 kg (150 lb)	317 cm (125 in)	287 cm (113 in)	(Belgium) TSV Vilvoorde
15	Gil Hofmans	2 May 1997	1.98 m (6 ft 6 in)	82 kg (181 lb)	320 cm (130 in)	296 cm (117 in)	(Belgium) Nivelles

== Pool B ==
Captain
Libero

=== Italy ===
The following is the Italian roster in the 2015 FIVB Volleyball Boys' U19 World Championship.

Head Coach: Mario Barbiero

No.	Name	Date of birth	Height	Weight	Spike	Block	2015 club
1	Pietro Margutti	20 April 1998	1.91 m (6 ft 3 in)	75 kg (165 lb)	334 cm (131 in)	300 cm (120 in)	(Italy) Club Italia Roma
2	Alessandro Piccinelli	30 January 1997	1.89 m (6 ft 2 in)	98 kg (216 lb)	315 cm (124 in)	290 cm (110 in)	(Italy) Volley Segrate
4	Edoardo Caneschi	26 January 1997	2.05 m (6 ft 9 in)	84 kg (185 lb)	348 cm (137 in)	325 cm (128 in)	(Italy) Club Italia Roma
5	Roberto Cominetti	20 April 1997	1.90 m (6 ft 3 in)	78 kg (172 lb)	335 cm (132 in)	315 cm (124 in)	(Italy) Vero Volley Monza
6	Riccardo Sbertoli	23 May 1998	1.88 m (6 ft 2 in)	85 kg (187 lb)	326 cm (128 in)	246 cm (97 in)	(Italy) Volley Segrate
7	Francesco Zoppellari	27 May 1997	1.85 m (6 ft 1 in)	79 kg (174 lb)	316 cm (124 in)	300 cm (120 in)	(Italy) Club Italia Roma
8	Paolo Zonca	13 May 1997	1.95 m (6 ft 5 in)	86 kg (190 lb)	336 cm (132 in)	315 cm (124 in)	(Italy) Club Italia Roma
9	Davide Cester	5 March 1997	1.96 m (6 ft 5 in)	90 kg (200 lb)	335 cm (132 in)	315 cm (124 in)	(Italy) Volley Treviso
10	Daniele Lavia	4 November 1999	1.98 m (6 ft 6 in)	81 kg (179 lb)	345 cm (136 in)	316 cm (124 in)	(Italy) Caffe' Aiello Corigliano
11	Gabriele Di Martino	20 July 1997	1.99 m (6 ft 6 in)	88 kg (194 lb)	340 cm (130 in)	320 cm (130 in)	(Italy) Club Italia Roma
12	Gianluca Galassi (C)	24 July 1997	2.01 m (6 ft 7 in)	94 kg (207 lb)	350 cm (140 in)	325 cm (128 in)	(Italy) Trentino Volley
15	Diego Cantagalli	13 February 1999	2.01 m (6 ft 7 in)	89 kg (196 lb)	348 cm (137 in)	310 cm (120 in)	(Italy) Lube Volley Treia

=== China ===
The following is the Chinese roster in the 2015 FIVB Volleyball Boys' U19 World Championship.

Head Coach: Jun Gu

No.	Name	Date of birth	Height	Weight	Spike	Block	2015 club
1	Guo Lei	25 December 1997	2.08 m (6 ft 10 in)	90 kg (200 lb)	357 cm (141 in)	345 cm (136 in)	(China) Shandong
3	Tao Zixuan	5 April 1999	2.00 m (6 ft 7 in)	95 kg (209 lb)	316 cm (124 in)	305 cm (120 in)	(China) Shanghai
4	Du Haoyu	2 August 1997	2.00 m (6 ft 7 in)	92 kg (203 lb)	332 cm (131 in)	325 cm (128 in)	(China) Army
5	Chen Leiyang	25 January 1999	1.98 m (6 ft 6 in)	95 kg (209 lb)	345 cm (136 in)	340 cm (130 in)	(China) Zhejiang
6	Zhou Liying	3 September 1997	1.95 m (6 ft 5 in)	95 kg (209 lb)	345 cm (136 in)	340 cm (130 in)	(China) Jiangsu
7	Wang Jingyi	7 February 1998	2.01 m (6 ft 7 in)	95 kg (209 lb)	340 cm (130 in)	330 cm (130 in)	(China) Shandong
8	Hu Jianwei	21 March 1998	1.95 m (6 ft 5 in)	96 kg (212 lb)	340 cm (130 in)	335 cm (132 in)	(China) Liaoning
10	Liu Zhihao (C)	29 June 1997	1.91 m (6 ft 3 in)	94 kg (207 lb)	345 cm (136 in)	345 cm (136 in)	(China) Shandong
11	Yu Yuantai	3 December 1997	1.83 m (6 ft 0 in)	75 kg (165 lb)	320 cm (130 in)	310 cm (120 in)	(China) Jiangsu
12	Yang Huaxing	18 February 1997	1.81 m (5 ft 11 in)	78 kg (172 lb)	330 cm (130 in)	320 cm (130 in)	(China) Shandong
13	Li Zihan	12 February 1998	1.80 m (5 ft 11 in)	75 kg (165 lb)	345 cm (136 in)	330 cm (130 in)	(China) Hubei
14	Jiang Hongbin	16 April 1997	1.91 m (6 ft 3 in)	92 kg (203 lb)	345 cm (136 in)	340 cm (130 in)	(China) Shanghai

=== Cuba ===
The following is the Cuban roster in the 2015 FIVB Volleyball Boys' U19 World Championship.

Head Coach: Jesús Cruz Lopez

No.	Name	Date of birth	Height	Weight	Spike	Block	2015 club
2	Miguel Lopez	25 March 1997	1.89 m (6 ft 2 in)	75 kg (165 lb)	345 cm (136 in)	320 cm (130 in)	(Cuba) Cienfuegos
4	Elieser Rojas	7 January 1997	1.96 m (6 ft 5 in)	71 kg (157 lb)	350 cm (140 in)	345 cm (136 in)	(Cuba) Havana
5	Javier Concepcion	27 December 1997	2.00 m (6 ft 7 in)	84 kg (185 lb)	356 cm (140 in)	350 cm (140 in)	(Cuba) Havana
6	Jorge Camejo	28 July 1999	1.87 m (6 ft 2 in)	68 kg (150 lb)	338 cm (133 in)	330 cm (130 in)	(Cuba) Pinar Del Rio
7	Ismel Pelayo	29 January 1997	1.89 m (6 ft 2 in)	82 kg (181 lb)	349 cm (137 in)	345 cm (136 in)	(Cuba) Matanzas
8	Gustavo Bryan	20 June 1997	1.98 m (6 ft 6 in)	86 kg (190 lb)	358 cm (141 in)	353 cm (139 in)	(Cuba) Guantanamo
9	Lazaro Barrete	2 March 1997	1.98 m (6 ft 6 in)	78 kg (172 lb)	358 cm (141 in)	350 cm (140 in)	(Cuba) Matanzas
12	Raciel Herrera	2 July 1998	1.98 m (6 ft 6 in)	85 kg (187 lb)	345 cm (136 in)	325 cm (128 in)	(Cuba) Pinar Del Rio
13	Jose Romero	5 January 1999	1.98 m (6 ft 6 in)	85 kg (187 lb)	350 cm (140 in)	325 cm (128 in)	(Cuba) Cienfuegos
15	Adrian Goide (C)	26 June 1998	1.91 m (6 ft 3 in)	80 kg (180 lb)	344 cm (135 in)	340 cm (130 in)	(Cuba) Sancti Spiritus
16	Roamy Alonso	24 July 1997	2.01 m (6 ft 7 in)	93 kg (205 lb)	350 cm (140 in)	330 cm (130 in)	(Cuba) Matanzas
19	Lionnis Salazar	25 July 1997	1.85 m (6 ft 1 in)	77 kg (170 lb)	332 cm (131 in)	332 cm (131 in)	Santiago de Cuba

=== Mexico ===
The following is the Mexican roster in the 2015 FIVB Volleyball Boys' U19 World Championship.

Head Coach: Gabriela Alarcon

No.	Name	Date of birth	Height	Weight	Spike	Block	2015 club
1	Ramon Lozoya	16 October 1998	1.90 m (6 ft 3 in)	80 kg (180 lb)	310 cm (120 in)	290 cm (110 in)	(Mexico) Nuevo Leon
2	Miguel Magdaleno	19 September 1998	1.80 m (5 ft 11 in)	80 kg (180 lb)	320 cm (130 in)	310 cm (120 in)	(Mexico) Chihuahua
3	Marco Manjarrez	23 June 1998	1.90 m (6 ft 3 in)	82 kg (181 lb)	320 cm (130 in)	310 cm (120 in)	(Mexico) Chihuahua
4	Orlando Lopez	19 May 1997	1.95 m (6 ft 5 in)	83 kg (183 lb)	320 cm (130 in)	310 cm (120 in)	(Mexico) Sinaloa
6	Ridel Garay (C)	9 June 1997	1.94 m (6 ft 4 in)	74 kg (163 lb)	326 cm (128 in)	299 cm (118 in)	(Mexico) Sonora
7	Carlos Briseño	7 September 1997	1.93 m (6 ft 4 in)	78 kg (172 lb)	326 cm (128 in)	299 cm (118 in)	(Mexico) Baja California
8	Jose Cardenas	26 May 1998	1.85 m (6 ft 1 in)	75 kg (165 lb)	310 cm (120 in)	290 cm (110 in)	(Mexico) Colima
10	Erick Valenciano	7 October 1997	1.96 m (6 ft 5 in)	83 kg (183 lb)	332 cm (131 in)	310 cm (120 in)	(Mexico) Coahuila
11	Bruno Cruz	29 March 1997	1.88 m (6 ft 2 in)	70 kg (150 lb)	332 cm (131 in)	290 cm (110 in)	(Mexico) Baja California
12	Ricardo Marquez	15 October 1998	1.70 m (5 ft 7 in)	70 kg (150 lb)	300 cm (120 in)	250 cm (98 in)	(Mexico) Chihuahua
15	Christian Aranda	9 April 1997	1.90 m (6 ft 3 in)	65 kg (143 lb)	322 cm (127 in)	288 cm (113 in)	(Mexico) Baja California
17	Diego Medrano	11 February 1997	1.99 m (6 ft 6 in)	68 kg (150 lb)	315 cm (124 in)	297 cm (117 in)	(Mexico) Colima

=== Egypt ===
The following is the Egyptian roster in the 2015 FIVB Volleyball Boys' U19 World Championship.

Head Coach: Emadeldin Nawar

No.	Name	Date of birth	Height	Weight	Spike	Block	2015 club
1	Ahmed Abo Gamil (C)	4 February 1997	1.90 m (6 ft 3 in)	74 kg (163 lb)	327 cm (129 in)	312 cm (123 in)	(Egypt) Petrojet
3	Omar Ahmed	3 August 1998	1.96 m (6 ft 5 in)	78 kg (172 lb)	326 cm (128 in)	316 cm (124 in)	(Egypt) Al Ahly
4	Omar Mohamed	8 November 1998	1.85 m (6 ft 1 in)	80 kg (180 lb)	322 cm (127 in)	314 cm (124 in)	(Egypt) Al Ahly
7	Abdalla Amer	30 October 1997	1.98 m (6 ft 6 in)	70 kg (150 lb)	305 cm (120 in)	290 cm (110 in)	(Egypt) Elettihad
8	Omar Aly	26 July 1997	1.93 m (6 ft 4 in)	88 kg (194 lb)	323 cm (127 in)	319 cm (126 in)	(Egypt) Elettihad
9	Mahmoud Mohamed	11 February 1998	1.87 m (6 ft 2 in)	76 kg (168 lb)	318 cm (125 in)	310 cm (120 in)	(Egypt) Aviation
10	Mohamed Zayed	16 December 1998	1.93 m (6 ft 4 in)	84 kg (185 lb)	319 cm (126 in)	314 cm (124 in)	(Egypt) Petrojet
11	Ahmed Ibrahim	23 July 1997	2.05 m (6 ft 9 in)	104 kg (229 lb)	330 cm (130 in)	327 cm (129 in)	(Egypt) Petrojet
13	Yasser Soliman	21 January 1998	1.92 m (6 ft 4 in)	79 kg (174 lb)	317 cm (125 in)	308 cm (121 in)	(Egypt) Heliopolis
15	Abdelrahman Seoudy	21 August 1997	2.06 m (6 ft 9 in)	100 kg (220 lb)	333 cm (131 in)	326 cm (128 in)	(Egypt) Police
17	Mohamed Aly	20 February 1998	1.93 m (6 ft 4 in)	83 kg (183 lb)	330 cm (130 in)	327 cm (129 in)	(Egypt) Zamalek
20	Marwan Badawi	14 May 1997	1.90 m (6 ft 3 in)	86 kg (190 lb)	325 cm (128 in)	314 cm (124 in)	(Egypt) Al Ahly

== Pool C ==
Captain
Libero

=== Poland ===
The following is the Polish roster in the 2015 FIVB Volleyball Boys' U19 World Championship.

Head Coach: Sebastian Pawlik

No.	Name	Date of birth	Height	Weight	Spike	Block	2015 club
1	Patryk Niemiec	18 February 1997	2.01 m (6 ft 7 in)	85 kg (187 lb)	337 cm (133 in)	320 cm (130 in)	(Poland) KS Jastrzebski Wegiel
2	Bartosz Kwolek	17 July 1997	1.92 m (6 ft 4 in)	91 kg (201 lb)	343 cm (135 in)	309 cm (122 in)	(Poland) KS Jastrzebski Wegiel
3	Jakub Kochanowski (C)	17 July 1997	1.99 m (6 ft 6 in)	89 kg (196 lb)	348 cm (137 in)	318 cm (125 in)	(Poland) AZS Olsztyn
4	Łukasz Kozub	3 November 1997	1.86 m (6 ft 1 in)	82 kg (181 lb)	333 cm (131 in)	300 cm (120 in)	(Poland) AKS Resovia Rzeszow
7	Jakub Szymański	25 March 1998	1.97 m (6 ft 6 in)	71 kg (157 lb)	338 cm (133 in)	306 cm (120 in)	(Poland) MOS Wola Warszawa
8	Jędrzej Gruszczyński	13 November 1997	1.85 m (6 ft 1 in)	74 kg (163 lb)	320 cm (130 in)	300 cm (120 in)	(Poland) KPS Progress Września
9	Jakub Ziobrowski	23 January 1997	2.02 m (6 ft 8 in)	96 kg (212 lb)	350 cm (140 in)	310 cm (120 in)	(Poland) AKS Resovia Rzeszow
10	Damian Domagała	23 April 1998	1.97 m (6 ft 6 in)	76 kg (168 lb)	332 cm (131 in)	305 cm (120 in)	(Poland) KS Wifama Łódź
11	Kamil Droszyński	28 January 1997	1.91 m (6 ft 3 in)	82 kg (181 lb)	335 cm (132 in)	310 cm (120 in)	(Poland) BKS Chemik Bydgoszcz
12	Dawid Woch	16 May 1997	1.98 m (6 ft 6 in)	71 kg (157 lb)	337 cm (133 in)	311 cm (122 in)	(Poland) Norwid Częstochowa
13	Mateusz Masłowski	13 June 1997	1.85 m (6 ft 1 in)	78 kg (172 lb)	320 cm (130 in)	300 cm (120 in)	(Poland) AKS Resovia Rzeszow
18	Tomasz Fornal	31 August 1997	1.98 m (6 ft 6 in)	93 kg (205 lb)	330 cm (130 in)	310 cm (120 in)	(Poland) EKS Skra Belchatów

=== Iran ===
The following is the Iranian roster in the 2015 FIVB Volleyball Boys' U19 World Championship.

Head Coach: Reza Vakili Farjad

No.	Name	Date of birth	Height	Weight	Spike	Block	2015 club
1	Rasoul Aghchehli (C)	28 January 1998	2.01 m (6 ft 7 in)	88 kg (194 lb)	340 cm (130 in)	310 cm (120 in)	(Iran) Erteashat Sanati
3	Esmaeil Mosaferdashliboroun	21 November 1997	1.90 m (6 ft 3 in)	70 kg (150 lb)	310 cm (120 in)	290 cm (110 in)	(Iran) Erteashat Sanati
6	Aliasghar Mojarad	30 October 1997	2.06 m (6 ft 9 in)	90 kg (200 lb)	345 cm (136 in)	320 cm (130 in)	(Iran) Erteashat Sanati
7	Mirbabak Mousavigargari	8 April 1997	1.91 m (6 ft 3 in)	80 kg (180 lb)	340 cm (130 in)	310 cm (120 in)	(Iran) Erteashat Sanati
8	Esmaeil Talebi Khameneh	9 June 1998	1.91 m (6 ft 3 in)	80 kg (180 lb)	300 cm (120 in)	280 cm (110 in)	(Iran) Erteashat Sanati
9	Teyeb Einisamarein	30 May 1997	2.05 m (6 ft 9 in)	90 kg (200 lb)	340 cm (130 in)	300 cm (120 in)	(Iran) Erteashat Sanati
12	Amirhossein Esfandiar	24 January 1999	2.05 m (6 ft 9 in)	98 kg (216 lb)	340 cm (130 in)	310 cm (120 in)	(Iran) Erteashat Sanati
13	Ali Ramezani	5 May 1998	1.99 m (6 ft 6 in)	96 kg (212 lb)	310 cm (120 in)	290 cm (110 in)	(Iran) Erteashat Sanati
14	Javad Karimisouchelmaei	1 March 1998	2.02 m (6 ft 8 in)	100 kg (220 lb)	340 cm (130 in)	310 cm (120 in)	(Iran) Erteashat Sanati
16	Ali Yousefpoornesfeji	20 April 1997	2.06 m (6 ft 9 in)	98 kg (216 lb)	340 cm (130 in)	320 cm (130 in)	(Iran) Saipa Alborz
17	Mahmood Rasooli	18 May 1998	2.05 m (6 ft 9 in)	95 kg (209 lb)	330 cm (130 in)	315 cm (124 in)	(Iran) Erteashat Sanati
20	Porya Yali	21 January 1999	2.07 m (6 ft 9 in)	80 kg (180 lb)	320 cm (130 in)	290 cm (110 in)	(Iran) Mizan Mashhad

=== Bulgaria ===
The following is the Bulgarian roster in the 2015 FIVB Volleyball Boys' U19 World Championship.

Head Coach: Dragan Ivanov

No.	Name	Date of birth	Height	Weight	Spike	Block	2015 club
1	Plamen Shekerdzhiev	21 May 1998	1.98 m (6 ft 6 in)	83 kg (183 lb)	345 cm (136 in)	328 cm (129 in)	(Bulgaria) VC CSKA Sofia
2	Kiril Kotev	26 March 1997	1.86 m (6 ft 1 in)	69 kg (152 lb)	328 cm (129 in)	308 cm (121 in)	(Bulgaria) Marek Union Ivkoni Dupnitsa
3	Dimitar Uzunov	14 March 1997	1.95 m (6 ft 5 in)	81 kg (179 lb)	340 cm (130 in)	320 cm (130 in)	(Bulgaria) Victoria Volley Plovdiv
4	Ivaylo Ivanov	12 April 1997	1.95 m (6 ft 5 in)	95 kg (209 lb)	332 cm (131 in)	312 cm (123 in)	(Bulgaria) Victoria Volley Plovdiv
6	Kristiyan Iliev	29 January 1997	1.94 m (6 ft 4 in)	82 kg (181 lb)	323 cm (127 in)	310 cm (120 in)	(Bulgaria) VC CSKA Sofia
8	Stanislav Dramov	18 March 1997	1.84 m (6 ft 0 in)	78 kg (172 lb)	315 cm (124 in)	300 cm (120 in)	(Bulgaria) Victoria Volley Plovdiv
9	Stefan Ivanov	31 March 1997	1.97 m (6 ft 6 in)	77 kg (170 lb)	333 cm (131 in)	312 cm (123 in)	(Bulgaria) Victoria Volley Plovdiv
11	Aleks Grozdanov	28 March 1998	2.06 m (6 ft 9 in)	86 kg (190 lb)	355 cm (140 in)	334 cm (131 in)	(Bulgaria) Levski Ball Sofia
12	Radoslav Parapunov (C)	19 June 1997	2.05 m (6 ft 9 in)	87 kg (192 lb)	346 cm (136 in)	327 cm (129 in)	(Bulgaria) VC CSKA Sofia
16	Gordan Lyutskanov	11 April 1997	1.97 m (6 ft 6 in)	86 kg (190 lb)	330 cm (130 in)	312 cm (123 in)	(Bulgaria) Teteven Volley - Teteven
17	Georgi Dimitrov	24 April 1997	1.84 m (6 ft 0 in)	72 kg (159 lb)	320 cm (130 in)	301 cm (119 in)	(Bulgaria) Victoria Volley Plovdiv
19	Nikolay Manchev	1 September 1997	1.87 m (6 ft 2 in)	78 kg (172 lb)	340 cm (130 in)	316 cm (124 in)	(Bulgaria) Levski Ball Sofia

=== Chile ===
The following is the Chilean roster in the 2015 FIVB Volleyball Boys' U19 World Championship.

Head Coach: Ivan Villarreal

No.	Name	Date of birth	Height	Weight	Spike	Block	2015 club
1	Esteban Villarreal (C)	1 August 1997	1.93 m (6 ft 4 in)	83 kg (183 lb)	325 cm (128 in)	315 cm (124 in)	Seleccion Chile
2	Ignacio Diaz	20 March 1997	1.87 m (6 ft 2 in)	82 kg (181 lb)	312 cm (123 in)	301 cm (119 in)	Seleccion Chile
4	Tomas Gago	11 June 1997	1.98 m (6 ft 6 in)	85 kg (187 lb)	330 cm (130 in)	319 cm (126 in)	Seleccion Chile
5	Marcelo Villalobos	6 February 1998	1.80 m (5 ft 11 in)	70 kg (150 lb)	300 cm (120 in)	290 cm (110 in)	(Chile) Manquehue
9	Fernando Cañas	19 March 1997	1.94 m (6 ft 4 in)	80 kg (180 lb)	330 cm (130 in)	312 cm (123 in)	(Chile) Universidad Catolica
10	Jean Thenoux	11 April 1997	1.89 m (6 ft 2 in)	78 kg (172 lb)	312 cm (123 in)	310 cm (120 in)	(Chile) Planeta Voley
11	Matias Ruiz	28 January 1997	1.84 m (6 ft 0 in)	81 kg (179 lb)	325 cm (128 in)	310 cm (120 in)	Seleccion Chile
13	Sebastian Soto	9 November 1998	1.78 m (5 ft 10 in)	88 kg (194 lb)	280 cm (110 in)	270 cm (110 in)	Seleccion Chile
14	Martin Massow	14 January 1997	1.86 m (6 ft 1 in)	70 kg (150 lb)	318 cm (125 in)	310 cm (120 in)	(Chile) Linares
15	Carlos Solar	14 January 1997	1.90 m (6 ft 3 in)	75 kg (165 lb)	325 cm (128 in)	315 cm (124 in)	Seleccion Chile
16	Sebastian Diaz	25 May 1999	1.97 m (6 ft 6 in)	77 kg (170 lb)	330 cm (130 in)	320 cm (130 in)	Seleccion Chile
18	Bastian Fuentes	17 April 1998	1.93 m (6 ft 4 in)	73 kg (161 lb)	320 cm (130 in)	310 cm (120 in)	Seleccion Chile

=== Chinese Taipei ===
The following is the Taiwanese roster in the 2015 FIVB Volleyball Boys' U19 World Championship.

Head Coach: Lee Chia-yung

No.	Name	Date of birth	Height	Weight	Spike	Block	2015 club
4	Chan Min-han	18 May 1997	1.90 m (6 ft 3 in)	90 kg (200 lb)	330 cm (130 in)	320 cm (130 in)	Chinese Taipei
5	Lin Yi-huei	19 February 1997	1.95 m (6 ft 5 in)	80 kg (180 lb)	333 cm (131 in)	320 cm (130 in)	Chinese Taipei
7	Chen Fu Yen	28 October 1997	1.98 m (6 ft 6 in)	82 kg (181 lb)	330 cm (130 in)	320 cm (130 in)	Chinese Taipei
8	Chou Chien-hung	18 May 1997	1.84 m (6 ft 0 in)	76 kg (168 lb)	320 cm (130 in)	305 cm (120 in)	Chinese Taipei
10	Tsai Chia-chun	7 November 1997	1.86 m (6 ft 1 in)	86 kg (190 lb)	310 cm (120 in)	300 cm (120 in)	Chinese Taipei
11	Huang Jeng-liang	17 February 1998	1.90 m (6 ft 3 in)	70 kg (150 lb)	325 cm (128 in)	310 cm (120 in)	Chinese Taipei
13	Huang Wen Yen	4 November 1998	1.85 m (6 ft 1 in)	78 kg (172 lb)	305 cm (120 in)	295 cm (116 in)	Chinese Taipei
16	Cheng Yu-sen	17 November 1998	1.74 m (5 ft 9 in)	62 kg (137 lb)	300 cm (120 in)	283 cm (111 in)	Chinese Taipei
17	Liang Chia-yuan	28 June 1997	1.80 m (5 ft 11 in)	90 kg (200 lb)	325 cm (128 in)	315 cm (124 in)	Chinese Taipei
18	Chen Yi-sheng	2 May 1997	1.80 m (5 ft 11 in)	69 kg (152 lb)	305 cm (120 in)	300 cm (120 in)	Chinese Taipei
19	Lin Lu-wei (C)	25 February 1997	1.90 m (6 ft 3 in)	75 kg (165 lb)	325 cm (128 in)	315 cm (124 in)	Chinese Taipei
20	Chiao Hsuan-cheng	9 June 1999	1.82 m (6 ft 0 in)	70 kg (150 lb)	305 cm (120 in)	300 cm (120 in)	Chinese Taipei

== Pool D ==
Captain
Libero

=== Brazil ===
The following is the Brazilian roster in the 2015 FIVB Volleyball Boys' U19 World Championship.

Head Coach: Percy Oncken

No.	Name	Date of birth	Height	Weight	Spike	Block	2015 club
1	Kaio Ribeiro	7 April 1997	1.92 m (6 ft 4 in)	78 kg (172 lb)	342 cm (135 in)	318 cm (125 in)	(Brazil) Maringá Volei
3	Fernando Pilan	27 August 1997	2.01 m (6 ft 7 in)	82 kg (181 lb)	332 cm (131 in)	318 cm (125 in)	(Brazil) Sesi-SP
7	Leonardo Almeida	25 January 1997	1.88 m (6 ft 2 in)	84 kg (185 lb)	312 cm (123 in)	336 cm (132 in)	(Brazil) Sesi-SP
9	Erick Costa (C)	29 June 1997	2.03 m (6 ft 8 in)	90 kg (200 lb)	340 cm (130 in)	318 cm (125 in)	(Brazil) Minas T.C.
10	Daniel Martins	5 June 1998	1.92 m (6 ft 4 in)	87 kg (192 lb)	333 cm (131 in)	310 cm (120 in)	(Brazil) Sesi-SP
11	Gabriel Bertolini	20 August 1997	1.99 m (6 ft 6 in)	93 kg (205 lb)	338 cm (133 in)	315 cm (124 in)	(Brazil) Sesi-SP
12	Jefferson Ferreira	3 July 1997	1.84 m (6 ft 0 in)	71 kg (157 lb)	331 cm (130 in)	310 cm (120 in)	(Brazil) Maringá Volei
13	Bruno Conte	6 July 1997	1.92 m (6 ft 4 in)	84 kg (185 lb)	333 cm (131 in)	307 cm (121 in)	(Brazil) Minas T.C.
15	Vitor Baesso	28 March 1998	1.98 m (6 ft 6 in)	91 kg (201 lb)	351 cm (138 in)	327 cm (129 in)	(Brazil) Sesi-SP
16	Lucas Araújo	24 June 1997	2.02 m (6 ft 8 in)	76 kg (168 lb)	336 cm (132 in)	324 cm (128 in)	(Brazil) Sesi-SP
17	Alexandre Figueiredo	30 September 1997	1.89 m (6 ft 2 in)	84 kg (185 lb)	323 cm (127 in)	306 cm (120 in)	(Brazil) Botafogo-RJ
20	Bernardo Assad	13 March 1998	1.88 m (6 ft 2 in)	83 kg (183 lb)	317 cm (125 in)	299 cm (118 in)	(Brazil) Sesi-SP

=== Russia ===
The following is the Russian roster in the 2015 FIVB Volleyball Boys' U19 World Championship.

Head Coach: Andrey Nozdrin

No.	Name	Date of birth	Height	Weight	Spike	Block	2015 club
1	Anton Semyshev	22 August 1997	2.01 m (6 ft 7 in)	90 kg (200 lb)	350 cm (140 in)	340 cm (130 in)	(Russia) Gazprom Ugra Surgut
3	Ivan Piskarev	7 June 1997	1.98 m (6 ft 6 in)	88 kg (194 lb)	340 cm (130 in)	330 cm (130 in)	(Russia) Yaroslavich Yaroslavl
5	Konstantin Abaev (C)	17 June 1999	1.92 m (6 ft 4 in)	82 kg (181 lb)	320 cm (130 in)	310 cm (120 in)	(Russia) Lokomotiv Novosibirsk
6	Aleksei Kononov	9 April 1997	2.05 m (6 ft 9 in)	93 kg (205 lb)	350 cm (140 in)	340 cm (130 in)	(Russia) Avtomobilist Saint Petersburg
7	Dmitry Yakovlev	21 June 1998	2.01 m (6 ft 7 in)	90 kg (200 lb)	350 cm (140 in)	340 cm (130 in)	(Russia) Dynamo Moscow
8	Aleksandr Melnikov	3 May 1997	2.00 m (6 ft 7 in)	90 kg (200 lb)	350 cm (140 in)	340 cm (130 in)	(Russia) Dynamo Moscow
9	Ivan Polianskii	12 June 1997	1.96 m (6 ft 5 in)	85 kg (187 lb)	340 cm (130 in)	330 cm (130 in)	(Russia) Yaroslavich Yaroslavl
10	Aleksei Chanchikov	30 January 1997	1.90 m (6 ft 3 in)	80 kg (180 lb)	330 cm (130 in)	320 cm (130 in)	(Russia) Dynamo Moscow
11	Egor Iakutin	27 January 1997	2.04 m (6 ft 8 in)	95 kg (209 lb)	340 cm (130 in)	330 cm (130 in)	(Russia) Zenit Kazan
12	Ilnur Rakhmatullin	6 November 1997	1.98 m (6 ft 6 in)	87 kg (192 lb)	330 cm (130 in)	320 cm (130 in)	(Russia) Zenit Kazan
14	Andrey Alekseev	29 January 1997	1.90 m (6 ft 3 in)	81 kg (179 lb)	310 cm (120 in)	300 cm (120 in)	(Russia) Fakel Novy Urengoy
18	Kirill Kletc	15 March 1998	2.02 m (6 ft 8 in)	92 kg (203 lb)	340 cm (130 in)	330 cm (130 in)	(Russia) Lokomotiv Novosibirsk

=== Germany ===
The following is the German roster in the 2015 FIVB Volleyball Boys' U19 World Championship.

Head Coach: Matus Kalny

No.	Name	Date of birth	Height	Weight	Spike	Block	2015 club
1	Christoph Aßmann	17 September 1997	1.97 m (6 ft 6 in)	80 kg (180 lb)	330 cm (130 in)	315 cm (124 in)	(Germany) VC Gotha
2	Moritz Rauber	16 February 1997	1.92 m (6 ft 4 in)	85 kg (187 lb)	330 cm (130 in)	315 cm (124 in)	(Germany) VfB Friedrichshafen
5	Maximilian Auste	27 January 1997	2.04 m (6 ft 8 in)	95 kg (209 lb)	340 cm (130 in)	320 cm (130 in)	(Germany) VCO Berlin
6	Johannes Tille	7 May 1997	1.86 m (6 ft 1 in)	73 kg (161 lb)	325 cm (128 in)	310 cm (120 in)	(Germany) TSV Mühldorf
11	Tobias Krick	22 October 1998	2.10 m (6 ft 11 in)	85 kg (187 lb)	350 cm (140 in)	330 cm (130 in)	(Germany) VI Frankfurt
12	Julian Zenger	26 August 1997	1.90 m (6 ft 3 in)	80 kg (180 lb)	330 cm (130 in)	315 cm (124 in)	(Germany) VfB Friedrichshafen
13	Stefan Thiel (C)	15 October 1997	1.85 m (6 ft 1 in)	73 kg (161 lb)	325 cm (128 in)	310 cm (120 in)	(Germany) VI Frankfurt
14	Oscar Benner	3 August 1998	1.97 m (6 ft 6 in)	95 kg (209 lb)	340 cm (130 in)	330 cm (130 in)	(Germany) TV/DJK Hammelburg
16	Peter Schnabel	28 October 1997	2.00 m (6 ft 7 in)	85 kg (187 lb)	340 cm (130 in)	320 cm (130 in)	(Germany) FT 1844 Freiburg
17	Lukas Maase	28 August 1998	2.08 m (6 ft 10 in)	95 kg (209 lb)	340 cm (130 in)	320 cm (130 in)	(Germany) VC Dresden
18	Tim Peter	8 September 1997	1.93 m (6 ft 4 in)	81 kg (179 lb)	325 cm (128 in)	310 cm (120 in)	(Germany) VI Frankfurt
20	Lukas Radzuweit	31 January 1997	1.98 m (6 ft 6 in)	85 kg (187 lb)	340 cm (130 in)	323 cm (127 in)	(Germany) VCO Hamburg

=== Japan ===
The following is the Japanese roster in the 2015 FIVB Volleyball Boys' U19 World Championship.

Head Coach: Hiroshi Honda

No.	Name	Date of birth	Height	Weight	Spike	Block	2015 club
1	Yuki Suzuki (C)	29 May 1997	2.01 m (6 ft 7 in)	75 kg (165 lb)	340 cm (130 in)	325 cm (128 in)	(Japan) Omonogawa High School
2	Kenji Sato	16 January 1997	1.95 m (6 ft 5 in)	80 kg (180 lb)	330 cm (130 in)	315 cm (124 in)	(Japan) Tokai University
3	Masaki Kaneko	23 October 1997	1.88 m (6 ft 2 in)	70 kg (150 lb)	333 cm (131 in)	320 cm (130 in)	(Japan) Higashi Fukuoka High School
4	Yoshiki Ohmi	16 April 1997	1.88 m (6 ft 2 in)	85 kg (187 lb)	325 cm (128 in)	310 cm (120 in)	(Japan) Sundai Gakuen High School
5	Chihiro Nishi	8 November 1997	1.91 m (6 ft 3 in)	68 kg (150 lb)	339 cm (133 in)	328 cm (129 in)	(Japan) Beppu Tsurumigaoka High School
6	Kenyu Nakamoto	21 November 1997	1.87 m (6 ft 2 in)	68 kg (150 lb)	325 cm (128 in)	305 cm (120 in)	(Japan) Nishihara Senior High School
7	Jin Tsuzuki	28 December 1998	1.94 m (6 ft 4 in)	78 kg (172 lb)	340 cm (130 in)	320 cm (130 in)	(Japan) Seijoh High School
8	Nobuto Saito	23 August 1997	1.82 m (6 ft 0 in)	70 kg (150 lb)	324 cm (128 in)	307 cm (121 in)	(Japan) Fukui Senior High School
9	Takaki Koyama	23 November 1997	1.91 m (6 ft 3 in)	76 kg (168 lb)	330 cm (130 in)	315 cm (124 in)	(Japan) Amagasaki Senior High School
10	Nassim Malki	27 July 1997	1.91 m (6 ft 3 in)	75 kg (165 lb)	330 cm (130 in)	315 cm (124 in)	(Japan) Kawagoe Higashi High School
11	Naoki Inokuchi	27 April 1997	1.73 m (5 ft 8 in)	63 kg (139 lb)	313 cm (123 in)	305 cm (120 in)	(Japan) Higashi Fukuoka High School
12	Tomohiro Horie	23 June 1997	1.83 m (6 ft 0 in)	70 kg (150 lb)	315 cm (124 in)	305 cm (120 in)	(Japan) Kaichi High School

=== Puerto Rico ===
The following is the Puerto Rican roster in the 2015 FIVB Volleyball Boys' U19 World Championship.

Head Coach: Julio Ruvira

No.	Name	Date of birth	Height	Weight	Spike	Block	2015 club
1	Julio Mercedes	19 April 1997	1.92 m (6 ft 4 in)	84 kg (185 lb)	245 cm (96 in)	238 cm (94 in)	(Puerto Rico) National Team
3	Victor Vazquez	6 November 1998	1.84 m (6 ft 0 in)	87 kg (192 lb)	246 cm (97 in)	240 cm (94 in)	(Puerto Rico) National Team
5	Jose Pacheco	20 March 1997	1.94 m (6 ft 4 in)	84 kg (185 lb)	242 cm (95 in)	237 cm (93 in)	(Puerto Rico) National Team
7	Marcos Guillen	6 July 1997	1.92 m (6 ft 4 in)	82 kg (181 lb)	238 cm (94 in)	232 cm (91 in)	(Puerto Rico) National Team
9	Pedro Molina	7 April 1999	1.92 m (6 ft 4 in)	81 kg (179 lb)	246 cm (97 in)	239 cm (94 in)	(Puerto Rico) National Team
10	Ivan Fernandez	27 October 1997	1.96 m (6 ft 5 in)	82 kg (181 lb)	246 cm (97 in)	241 cm (95 in)	(Puerto Rico) National Team
11	Luis Ocasio	1 April 1997	1.89 m (6 ft 2 in)	81 kg (179 lb)	245 cm (96 in)	239 cm (94 in)	(Puerto Rico) National Team
13	Gabriel Garcia	8 January 1999	1.98 m (6 ft 6 in)	92 kg (203 lb)	242 cm (95 in)	237 cm (93 in)	(Puerto Rico) National Team
14	Pelegrin Vargas (C)	31 July 1998	1.93 m (6 ft 4 in)	87 kg (192 lb)	242 cm (95 in)	236 cm (93 in)	(Puerto Rico) National Team
15	Oscar Fiorentino	5 February 1997	1.89 m (6 ft 2 in)	82 kg (181 lb)	245 cm (96 in)	239 cm (94 in)	(Puerto Rico) National Team
17	Jonathan Rodriguez	16 September 1997	1.93 m (6 ft 4 in)	82 kg (181 lb)	243 cm (96 in)	238 cm (94 in)	(Puerto Rico) National Team
20	Carlos Rivera	21 October 1998	1.83 m (6 ft 0 in)	84 kg (185 lb)	245 cm (96 in)	238 cm (94 in)	(Puerto Rico) National Team

== See also ==
- 2015 FIVB Volleyball Girls' U18 World Championship squads
