= Jae-wook =

- Hangul: 재욱
- RR: Jaeuk
- MR: Chaeuk

Jae-wook is a Korean given name.

People with this name include:

- Ko Jae-wook (born 1951), South Korean football manager
- Ahn Jae-wook (born 1971), South Korean actor and singer
- Kim Jae-wook (born 1983), South Korean actor and model
- Ahn Se-ha (born Ahn Jae-wook, 1986), South Korean actor
- No Jae-wook (born 1992), South Korean volleyball player
- Lee Jae-wook (born 1998), South Korean actor and model

== See also ==
- List of Korean given names
