= Anup D'Costa =

Indian volleyball player (born 1993)

Personal information
- Full name: Anup D'Costa
- Born: 7 January 1993 (age 33); Kundapura
- Hometown: Kundapura, Karnataka
- Height: 193 cm (6 ft 4 in)
- Weight: 97 Kg
- Spike: 3.65 m (144 in)
- Block: 3.40 m (134 in)

Volleyball information
- Position: Universal attacker
- Current team: Income tax
- Number: 07
Honours
Eklavya award, KOA Award, Kemp'gowda Award

Anup D'Costa (born 7 January 1993 in Kundapura, Karnataka) is an Indian volleyball player, represented India in 2010 Asian Youth Boys Volleyball Championship held in Azadi Volleyball Hall, Tehran, Iran from 13 to 21 May 2010. He was judged Best Scorer of the Championship.He is Ekalavya award winner.

== Early life ==
Anup D'Costa was born on 7 January 1993 at Kundapur village, Karnataka. He started playing from 2007. In 2008, he got national attention when he played Junior national from Karnataka Team. Because of his national level recognition, he was rewarded with a job in Income Tax department in 2013.

== Professional life ==
Playing Timeline
Year	Tournaments
2008	Junior Volleyball Nationals
2010	Asian Championship
2011	Karnataka Bull's (IVL)
2012	Tunisia Tournament
2013	World Championship (Turkey)
2015	Asian Championship (Myanmar), Asian Senior Men's Championship (Iran), Senior Championships (South Africa )

Anup is an integral part of Income Tax Department team. He wears number 07 jersey and plays in the position of Universal. Anup D'Costa has also been awarded as the Best scorer in Asian Youth Championship(2010) and in World Championship(2013).

== Awards ==
- He received Eklayva Award in year 2016 by Karnataka State government.
- He received KOA Award in year 2012 by Karnataka State government.
- He received Kemp'gowda Award in year 2015 by Karnataka State government.
