= No Jae-wook =

South Korean volleyball player (born 1992)

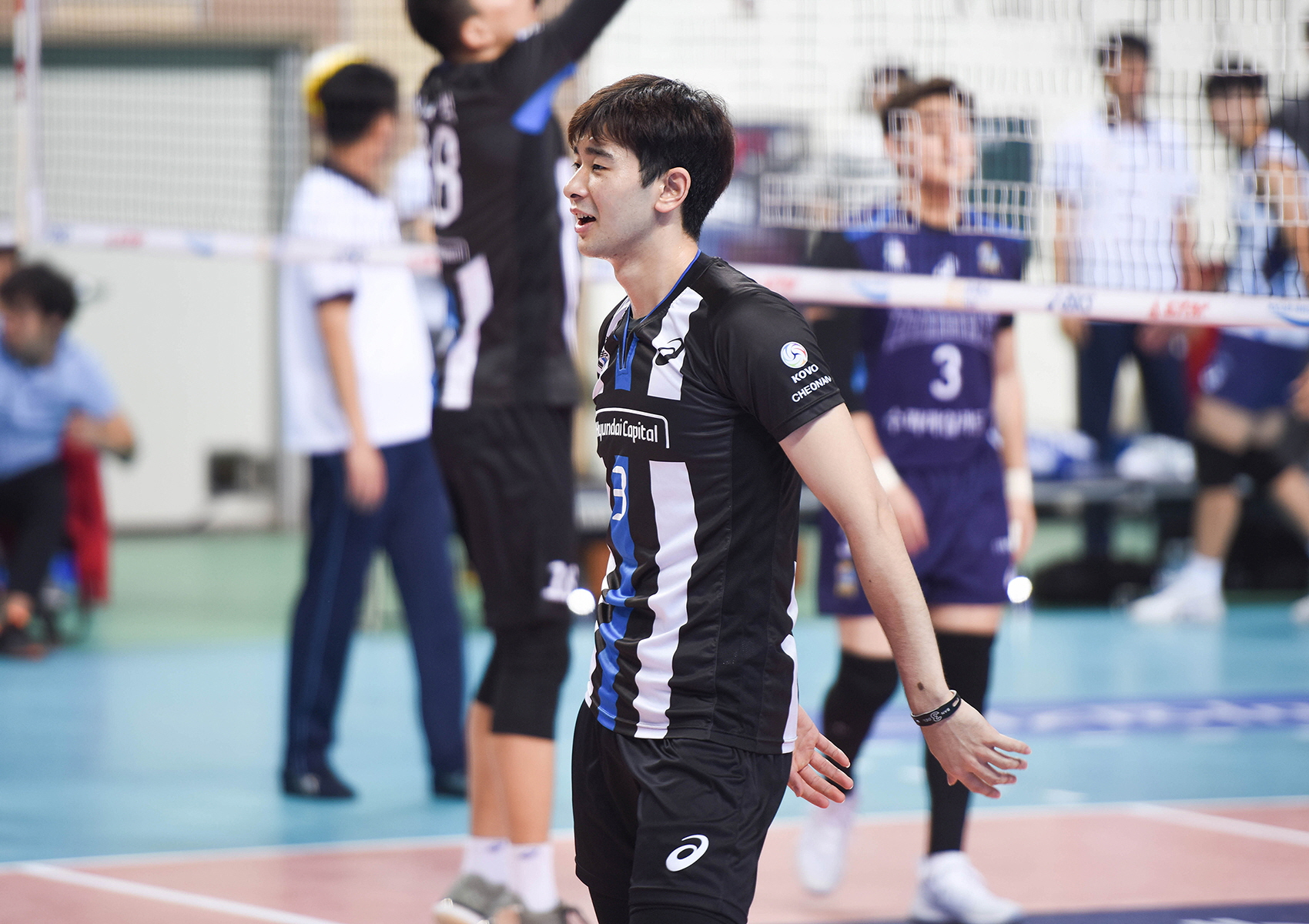
- No in 2017

Personal information
- Nationality: South Korean
- Born: 10 July 1992 (age 34); Gwangju, South Korea
- Height: 191 cm (6 ft 3 in)
- Weight: 86 kg (190 lb)
- Spike: 310 cm (10 ft 2 in)
- Block: 300 cm (9 ft 10 in)
- Education: Sungkyunkwan University

Volleyball information
- Position: Setter
- Current club: Seoul Woori Card Wibee
- Number: 3

Career
Years	Teams
2014–2015; 2015–2018; 2018–	LIG; Hyundai Capital; Woori Card

National team
2017–	South Korea
Honours
Asian Championship
Bronze medal – third place	2017 Gresik
Asian Youth Championship
Bronze medal – third place	2010 Tehran
- Last updated: 29 December 2017

No Jae-wook (Korean: 노재욱; born 10 July 1992 in Gwangju) is a South Korean male volleyball player. He is part of the South Korea men's national volleyball team. On club level he plays the setter position for Seoul Woori Card Wibee.

== Career ==
=== Clubs ===
In the 2014 V-League Draft, No was selected third overall by the LIG Greaters.

After having a mediocre rookie season in the Greaters, No was traded to the Hyundai Capital Skywalkers in 2015. No earned the starting spot for the Skywalkers in the 2015–16 season, racking up 1,179 total assists and averaging 10.72 per set.

In the 2016–17 season, No won his first championship, setting the Skywalkers to their third V-League title.

=== National team ===
In 2010 No got called up to the South Korean national under-18 team for the 2010 Asian Youth Championship where his team won the bronze medal. During the tourney, he mostly served as the backup setter to Lee Min-gyu.

In May 2017 No was first selected for the South Korean senior national team to compete at the 2017 FIVB World League. After finishing the World League in 18th place, he also took part in the 2017 Asian Championship, where South Korea won the bronze medal.
