= Mirbabak Mousavi =

Iranian volleyball player (born 1997)

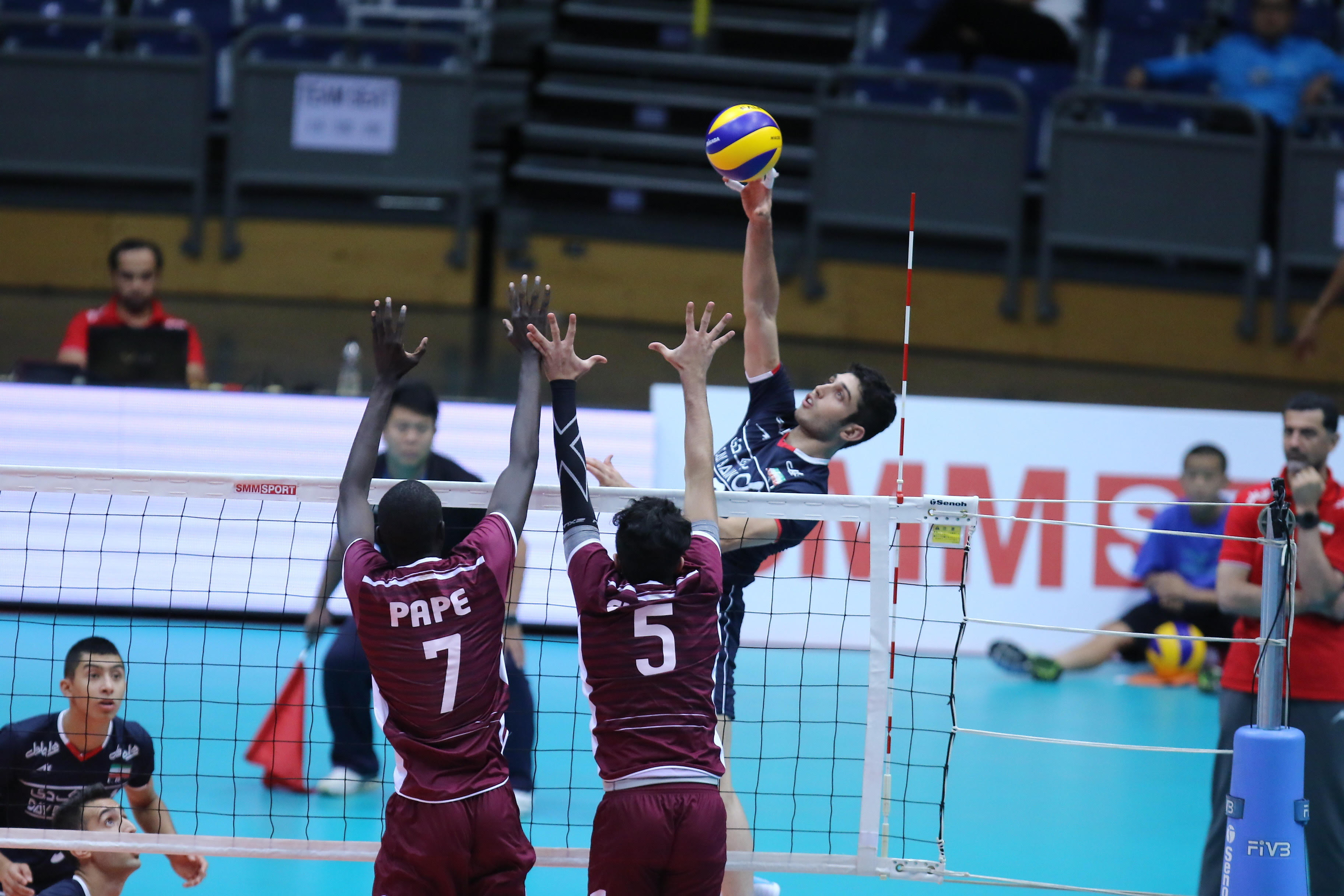

Personal information
- Full name: Mirbabak Mousavi
- Born: April 8, 1997 (age 29); Tabriz, Iran
- Height: 2.05 m (6 ft 9 in)
- Weight: 104 kg (229 lb)
- Spike: 3.30 m (130 in)
- Block: 3.17 m (125 in)

Volleyball information
- Position: Outside hitter
- Current club: (Iran) Nian Electronic Khorasan
- Number: 7

Career
| Years | Teams |
|---|---|
| 2013; 2014; 2015; 2016; 2017; 2018; 2019; 2020; 2021; 2022 | Shahrdari Tabriz; Erteashat Sanati Iran; Sarmayeh Bank Tehran; Khatam Ardakan; Shahrdari Tabriz; Shahrdari Tabriz; Shahrdari Gonbad; Paykan Tehran; Azar Battery Urmia; Nian Electronic Khorasan |

Mirbabak Mousavigargari (Persian: میربابک موسوی, born April 8, 1997, in Tabriz) is an Iranian volleyball player who plays as an Outside hitter for the Iranian National Youth and Youth and Iranian club Nian Electronic Khorasan VC.

Mousavi has a history of playing in the Iran national beach soccer team and Iranian students' volleyball.
