= 2022 Asian Men's U18 Volleyball Championship =

Tournament details
- Host country: Iran
- City: Tehran
- Dates: 15–22 August
- Teams: 8
- Venue: 1 (in 1 host city)

Final positions
- Champions: Japan (3rd title)
- Runners-up: Iran
- Third place: India
- Fourth place: South Korea

Tournament awards
- MVP: (Japan) Hiroki Bito
- Best Setter: (Iran) Emran Kook Jili
- Best OH: (Japan) Shunta Ono (Iran) S.Matin Hosseini
- Best MB: (Iran) Taha Behboudnia (India) Kush Singh
- Best OPP: (India) Aryan Baliyan
- Best Libero: (Japan) Sena Kameoka

Tournament statistics
- Matches played: 24
- Attendance: 5,100 (213 per match)

The 2022 Asian Men's U18 Volleyball Championship was the 14th edition of the Asian Men's U18 Volleyball Championship, a biennial international volleyball tournament organised by the Asian Volleyball Confederation (AVC), that year with the Islamic Republic of Iran Volleyball Federation (IRIVF). The tournament was held at the Volleyball Federation Hall, Tehran, Iran from 15 to 22 August 2022.

The competition served as a qualification tournament for the FIVB Volleyball Boys' U19 World Championship. The top four teams of the tournament qualified for the 2023 FIVB Volleyball Boys' U19 World Championship as AVC's representatives.

Players born on or after January 1, 2005, were eligible to participate.

== Pools composition ==
Eight teams were divided into 2 Pools (Pool A & Pool B)

- Seeding for the host and top 3 teams from the previous event by serpentine system.
- Drawing of lots for the remaining 4 teams (based on the previous ranking and zones).

Pool A	Pool B
Iran (Host); Chinese Taipei (4th); China; Kuwait	Japan (1st); South Korea (2nd); Thailand; India

== Format ==
Preliminary Round: Round Robin to determine ranking.

Knockout Stage: All 8 teams entered a quarterfinal for cross elimination (A1:B4, B1:A4 etc.) to determine the champion.

== Venue ==
All matches
Tehran, Iran
Volleyball Federation Hall
Capacity: 3,000
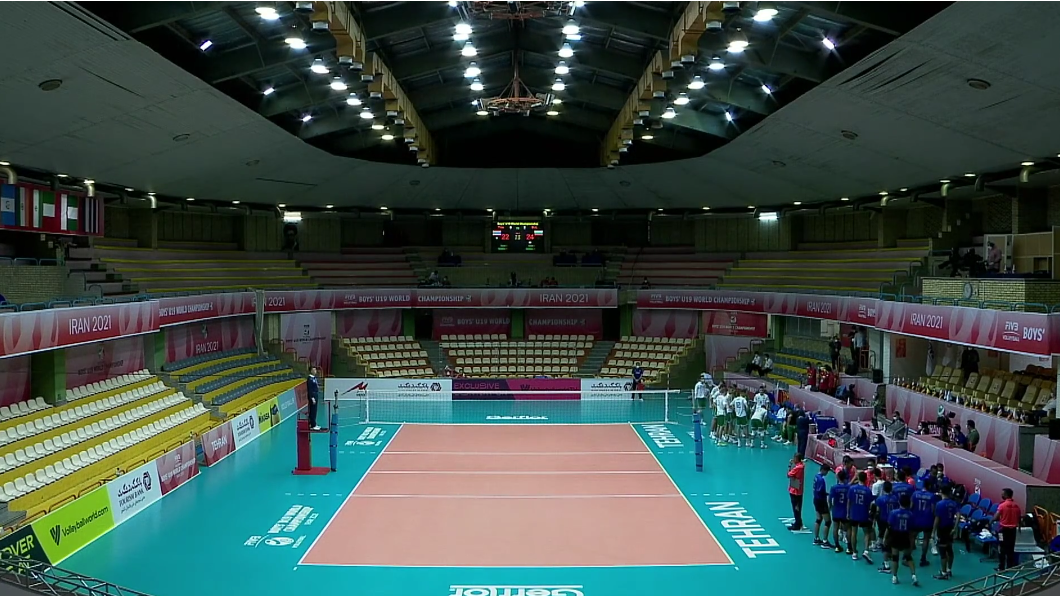

== Pool standing procedure ==
1. Number of victories
2. Match points
3. Set quotient
4. Points quotient
5. If the tie continues as per the point quotient between two teams, the priority will be given to the team which won the last match between them. When the tie in points quotient is between three or more teams, a new classification of these teams in the terms of points 1, 2 and 3 will be made taking into consideration only the matches in which they were opposed to each other.

Match won 3–0 or 3–1: 3 match points for the winner, 0 match points for the loser
Match won 3–2: 2 match points for the winner, 1 match point for the loser

== Preliminary round ==
- All times are Iran Daylight Time (UTC+04:30).

Qualified for the Quarterfinals

=== Pool A ===
Pos	Team	Pld	W	L	Pts	SW	SL	SR	SPW	SPL	SPR	Qualification
1	Iran	3	3	0	9	9	0	MAX	225	155	1.452	Quarterfinals
2	China	3	2	1	6	6	3	2.000	217	193	1.124	Quarterfinals
3	Chinese Taipei	3	1	2	3	3	7	0.429	216	226	0.956	Quarterfinals
4	Kuwait	3	0	3	0	1	9	0.111	161	245	0.657	Quarterfinals

Date	Time		Score		Set 1	Set 2	Set 3	Set 4	Set 5	Total	Report
15 Aug	17:00	Chinese Taipei	3–1	Kuwait	25–11	25–17	20–25	25–16		95–69	Report
16 Aug	17:00	China	0–3	Iran	21–25	17–25	22–25			60–75	Report
17 Aug	14:00	China	3–0	Chinese Taipei	25–20	32–30	25–22			82–72	Report
17 Aug	17:00	Iran	3–0	Kuwait	25–12	25–21	25–13			75–46	Report
18 Aug	14:00	China	3–0	Kuwait	25–15	25–19	25–12			75–46	Report
18 Aug	17:00	Iran	3–0	Chinese Taipei	25–15	25–18	25–16			75–49	Report

=== Pool B ===
Pos	Team	Pld	W	L	Pts	SW	SL	SR	SPW	SPL	SPR	Qualification
1	Japan	3	3	0	6	9	6	1.500	320	292	1.096	Quarterfinals
2	India	3	2	1	7	8	4	2.000	282	268	1.052	Quarterfinals
3	South Korea	3	1	2	4	5	7	0.714	236	238	0.992	Quarterfinals
4	Thailand	3	0	3	1	3	9	0.333	248	288	0.861	Quarterfinals

Date	Time		Score		Set 1	Set 2	Set 3	Set 4	Set 5	Total	Report
15 Aug	11:30	Japan	3–2	India	25–20	25–23	23–25	21–25	15–13	109–106	Report
15 Aug	14:30	South Korea	3–0	Thailand	27–25	25–17	25–20			77–62	Report
16 Aug	11:30	India	3–1	Thailand	25–21	24–26	27–25	25–23		101–95	Report
16 Aug	14:00	Japan	3–2	South Korea	21–25	25–18	25–14	15–25	15–13	101–95	Report
17 Aug	11:30	Thailand	2–3	Japan	15–25	25–22	17–25	25–23	9–15	91–110	Report
18 Aug	11:30	South Korea	0–3	India	23–25	20–25	21–25			64–75	Report

== Final round ==
- All times are Iran Daylight Time (UTC+4:30).

Quarterfinals
20 August
Japan	3
Kuwait	0
20 August
China	2
South Korea	3
20 August
India	3
Chinese Taipei	1
20 August
Iran	3
Thailand	1

Semifinals
21 August
Japan	3
South Korea	1
21 August
India	0
Iran	3

Final
22 August
Japan	3
Iran	0
3rd place match
22 August
South Korea	2
India	3

5th–8th semifinals
21 August
Kuwait	0
China	3
21 August
Chinese Taipei	3
Thailand	1

5th place match
22 August
China	3
Chinese Taipei	2
7th place match
22 August
Kuwait	1
Thailand	3

=== Quarterfinals ===
Date	Time		Score		Set 1	Set 2	Set 3	Set 4	Set 5	Total	Report
20 Aug	09:00	China	2–3	South Korea	22–25	25–23	22–25	25–22	13–15	107–110	Report
20 Aug	11:30	India	3–1	Chinese Taipei	25–19	25–14	25–27	25–23		100–83	Report
20 Aug	14:00	Japan	3–0	Kuwait	25–21	25–18	25–12			75–51	Report
20 Aug	17:00	Iran	3–1	Thailand	24–26	25–13	25–19	25–15		99–73	Report

=== 5th–8th semifinals ===
Date	Time		Score		Set 1	Set 2	Set 3	Set 4	Set 5	Total	Report
21 Aug	09:00	China	3–0	Kuwait	25–18	25–22	25–18			75–58	Report
21 Aug	11:30	Chinese Taipei	3–1	Thailand	21–25	25–22	26–24	25–20		97–91	Report

=== Semifinals ===
Date	Time		Score		Set 1	Set 2	Set 3	Set 4	Set 5	Total	Report
21 Aug	14:00	South Korea	1–3	Japan	39–37	22–25	21–25	14–25		96–112	Report
21 Aug	17:00	India	0–3	Iran	15–25	19–25	18–25			52–75	Report

=== 7th place match ===
Date	Time		Score		Set 1	Set 2	Set 3	Set 4	Set 5	Total	Report
22 Aug	09:00	Kuwait	1–3	Thailand	25–23	18–25	8–25	17–25		68–98	Report

=== 5th place match ===
Date	Time		Score		Set 1	Set 2	Set 3	Set 4	Set 5	Total	Report
22 Aug	11:30	China	3–2	Chinese Taipei	25–16	15–25	18–25	25–20	17–15	100–101	Report

=== 3rd place match ===
Date	Time		Score		Set 1	Set 2	Set 3	Set 4	Set 5	Total	Report
22 Aug	14:00	South Korea	2–3	India	20–25	21–25	28–26	25–19	12–15	106–110	Report

=== Final ===
Date	Time		Score		Set 1	Set 2	Set 3	Set 4	Set 5	Total	Report
22 Aug	17:00	Japan	3–0	Iran	25–22	25–22	25–23			75–67	Report

== Final standing ==
Rank	Team
1st place, gold medalist(s)	Japan
2nd place, silver medalist(s)	Iran
3rd place, bronze medalist(s)	India
4	South Korea
5	China
6	Chinese Taipei
7	Thailand
8	Kuwait

Qualified for the 2023 FIVB Boys' U19 World Championship

2022 Men's Asian U18 champions

Japan
3rd title

12–boy roster
Setter：Ota Yoshihara(c), Aguri Hara

Outside Hitter：Kai Cousins, Yuta Doi, Rinto Nagata, Hiroki Bito, Shunta Ono
Middle Blocker：Hyo Yamashita, Yuzuki Akimoto, Mark Allen Junior Rosen, Takeru Watanabe
Libero： Sena Kameoka

Head coach: Hiroshi Honda

== Awards ==
- Most valuable player
  Hiroki Bito (JPN)
- Best setter
  Emran Kook Jili (IRI)
- Best outside hitters
  Shunta Ono (JPN)
  S.Matin Hosseini (IRI)
- Best middle blockers
  Taha Behboudnia (IRI)
  Kush Singh (IND)
- Best opposite spiker
  Aryan Baliyan (IND)
- Best libero
  Sena Kameoka (JPN)

== See also ==
- 2022 Asian Women's U18 Volleyball Championship
- 2022 Asian Men's U20 Volleyball Championship
