= Lionnis Salazar =

Cuban volleyball player (born 1997)

Lionnis Salazar Rubiera

Personal information
- Nationality: Cuban
- Born: 25 July 1997 (age 29)
- Height: 185 cm (6 ft 1 in)
- Weight: 47 kg (104 lb)
- Spike: 332 cm (131 in)
- Block: 332 cm (131 in)
- Education: Centennial College

Volleyball information
- Current club: Centennial College
- Number: 5

Career
Years	Teams
2015	Santiago de Cuba

National team
2015	Cuba

Lionnis Salazar Rubiera (born 25 July 1997) is a Cuban male volleyball player. He is part of the Cuba men's national volleyball team. On club level he plays for Santiago de Cuba. Since January 2023 he has been attending Centennial College in Toronto, Canada.
