= Lou Kindt =

Belgian volleyball player (born 1997)

Personal information
- Nationality: Belgian
- Born: 25 May 1997 (age 29)

Volleyball information
- Position: right side hitter
- Current club: Volley Menen
- Number: 15

Career
Years	Teams
2015; 2016-2017; 2017-2019; 2019-2021; 2021	(Belgium) VBS Vilvoorde; Lindemans Aalst; Knack Roeselare; Volleybalclub Maaseik; Volley Menen

National team
2015	Belgium

Lou Kindt (born 25 May 1997) is a Belgian male volleyball player. He is part of the Belgium men's national volleyball team. He competed at the 2015 European Games in Baku. On club level he plays for Volley Menen.
