= 1999 Asian Youth Men's Volleyball Championship =

Volleyball Tournament

Tournament details
- Host country: Taiwan
- Dates: 20–25 April
- Teams: 8
- Venue: 1 (in 1 host city)

Final positions
- Champions: South Korea (1st title)

The 1999 Asian Youth Men's Volleyball Championship was held in Chiayi City, Taiwan from 20 to 25 April 1999.

== Pools composition ==
The teams were seeded based on their final ranking at the 1997 Asian Youth Boys Volleyball Championship.

Pool A	Pool B
Chinese Taipei (Host & 1st); China (4th); Philippines; Saudi Arabia	South Korea (2nd); Japan (3rd); Thailand; Australia

== Preliminary round ==
=== Pool A ===
Pos	Team	Pld	W	L	Pts	SW	SL	SR	SPW	SPL	SPR	Qualification
1	China	3	3	0	6	9	0	MAX	236	170	1.388	Semifinals
2	Saudi Arabia	3	2	1	5	6	5	1.200	244	199	1.226	Semifinals
3	Chinese Taipei	3	1	2	4	5	6	0.833	243	226	1.075	5th–8th place
4	Philippines	3	0	3	3	0	9	0.000	97	225	0.431	5th–8th place

Date		Score		Set 1	Set 2	Set 3	Set 4	Set 5	Total
20 Apr	China	3–0	Philippines	25–9	25–11	25–14			75–34
20 Apr	Chinese Taipei	2–3	Saudi Arabia	18–25	17–25	25–19	25–22	10–15	95–106
21 Apr	Chinese Taipei	0–3	China	20–25	34–36	19–25			73–86
21 Apr	Saudi Arabia	3–0	Philippines	25–10	25–13	25–6			75–29
22 Apr	China	3–0	Saudi Arabia	25–22	25–22	25–19			75–63
22 Apr	Philippines	0–3	Chinese Taipei	10–25	10–25	14–25			34–75

=== Pool B ===
Pos	Team	Pld	W	L	Pts	SW	SL	SR	SPW	SPL	SPR	Qualification
1	South Korea	3	3	0	6	9	2	4.500	248	114	2.175	Semifinals
2	Japan	3	2	1	5	8	4	2.000	234	127	1.843	Semifinals
3	Thailand	3	1	2	4	4	6	0.667	116	212	0.547	5th–8th place
4	Australia	3	0	3	3	0	9	0.000	83	228	0.364	5th–8th place

Date		Score		Set 1	Set 2	Set 3	Set 4	Set 5	Total
20 Apr	South Korea	3–0	Thailand	25–15	25–17	25–13			75–45
20 Apr	Australia	0–3	Japan	14–25	15–25	13–25			42–75
21 Apr	Thailand	1–3	Japan	13–25	22–25	26–24	19–25		80–99
21 Apr	South Korea	3–0	Australia	25–15	25–14	25–16			75–45
22 Apr	Australia	0–3	Thailand	19–25	17–25	17–25			53–75
22 Apr	Japan	2–3	South Korea	25–17	20–25	25–23	35–37	13–15	118–117

== Final round ==
- The results and the points of the matches between the same teams that were already played during the preliminary round were taken into account for the final round.

=== Classification 5th–8th ===
Pos	Team	Pld	W	L	Pts	SW	SL	SR	SPW	SPL	SPR
5	Chinese Taipei	3	3	0	6	9	1	9.000	246	164	1.500
6	Thailand	3	2	1	5	7	3	2.333	218	189	1.153
7	Australia	3	1	2	4	3	7	0.429	216	240	0.900
8	Philippines	3	0	3	3	1	9	0.111	164	251	0.653

Date		Score		Set 1	Set 2	Set 3	Set 4	Set 5	Total
24 Apr	Chinese Taipei	3–0	Australia	27–25	25–19	25–18			77–62
24 Apr	Thailand	3–0	Philippines	25–10	25–14	25–18			75–42
25 Apr	Philippines	1–3	Australia	20–25	26–28	25–23	17–25		88–101
25 Apr	Chinese Taipei	3–1	Thailand	25–12	25–18	19–25	25–13		94–68

=== Championship ===
Pos	Team	Pld	W	L	Pts	SW	SL	SR	SPW	SPL	SPR
1	South Korea	3	3	0	6	9	3	3.000	290	275	1.055
2	Japan	3	2	1	5	8	6	1.333	322	302	1.066
3	China	3	1	2	4	5	6	0.833	244	243	1.004
4	Saudi Arabia	3	0	3	3	2	9	0.222	236	272	0.868

Date		Score		Set 1	Set 2	Set 3	Set 4	Set 5	Total
24 Apr	China	2–3	Japan	23–25	25–21	25–19	20–25	10–15	103–105
24 Apr	South Korea	3–1	Saudi Arabia	31–29	17–25	25–21	25–16		98–91
25 Apr	Saudi Arabia	1–3	Japan	14–25	23–25	26–24	19–25		82–99
25 Apr	China	0–3	South Korea	22–25	23–25	21–25			66–75

== Final standing ==
Rank	Team
1st place, gold medalist(s)	South Korea
2nd place, silver medalist(s)	Japan
3rd place, bronze medalist(s)	China
4	Saudi Arabia
5	Chinese Taipei
6	Thailand
7	Australia
8	Philippines

Qualified for the 1999 FIVB Youth World Championship

1999 Asian Youth Boys champions

South Korea
First title

== See also ==
- List of sporting events in Taiwan
