= 1997 Asian Youth Men's Volleyball Championship =

Tournament details
- Host country: Philippines
- Dates: 5–10 April
- Teams: 8
- Venue: 1 (in 1 host city)

Final positions
- Champions: Chinese Taipei (1st title)

The 1997 Asian Youth Men's Volleyball Championship was held in Baguio, Philippines from 5 to 10 April 1997.

== Preliminary round ==
=== Pool A ===
Pos	Team	Pld	W	L	Pts	SW	SL	SR	SPW	SPL	SPR	Qualification
1	Japan	3	3	0	6	0	0	—	0	0	—	Championship round
2	China	3	2	1	5	0	0	—	0	0	—	Championship round
3	United Arab Emirates	3	1	2	4	0	0	—	0	0	—	
4	Philippines	3	0	3	3	0	0	—	0	0	—	

=== Pool B ===
Pos	Team	Pld	W	L	Pts	SW	SL	SR	SPW	SPL	SPR	Qualification
1	Chinese Taipei	3	3	0	6	0	0	—	0	0	—	Championship round
2	South Korea	3	2	1	5	0	0	—	0	0	—	Championship round
3	Thailand	3	1	2	4	0	0	—	0	0	—	
4	Australia	3	0	3	3	0	9	0.000	62	226	0.274	

Date		Score		Set 1	Set 2	Set 3	Set 4	Set 5	Total
05 Apr	South Korea	3–0	Australia	15–10	15–7	15–5			45–22
05 Apr	Thailand	?–3	Chinese Taipei						
06 Apr	Thailand	?–3	South Korea						
06 Apr	Chinese Taipei	3–0	Australia	15–4	15–8	15–3			45–15
07 Apr	Australia	0–3	Thailand	4–15	14–16	7–15			25–46
07 Apr	South Korea	?–3	Chinese Taipei						

== Final round ==
- The results and the points of the matches between the same teams that were already played during the preliminary round were taken into account for the final round.

=== Classification 5th–8th ===
Pos	Team	Pld	W	L	Pts	SW	SL	SR	SPW	SPL	SPR
5	Thailand	3	3	0	6	0	0	—	0	0	—
6	Australia	3	2	1	5	6	5	1.200	131	137	0.956
7	United Arab Emirates	3	1	2	4	0	0	—	0	0	—
8	Philippines	3	0	3	3	0	0	—	0	0	—

Date		Score		Set 1	Set 2	Set 3	Set 4	Set 5	Total
09 Apr	United Arab Emirates	2–3	Australia	15–5	14–16	15–10	4–15	13–15	61–61
09 Apr	Thailand	3–?	Philippines						
10 Apr	Philippines	0–3	Australia	10–15	8–15	12–15			30–45
10 Apr	United Arab Emirates	?–3	Thailand						

=== Championship ===
Pos	Team	Pld	W	L	Pts	SW	SL	SR	SPW	SPL	SPR
1	Chinese Taipei	3	3	0	6	0	0	—	0	0	—
2	South Korea	3	2	1	5	0	0	—	0	0	—
3	Japan	3	1	2	4	0	0	—	0	0	—
4	China	3	0	3	3	0	0	—	0	0	—

== Final standing ==
Rank	Team
1st place, gold medalist(s)	Chinese Taipei
2nd place, silver medalist(s)	South Korea
3rd place, bronze medalist(s)	Japan
4	China
5	Thailand
6	Australia
7	United Arab Emirates
8	Philippines

Qualified for the 1997 FIVB Youth World Championship

1997 Asian Youth Boys champions

Chinese Taipei
First title
