= 2010 Asian Youth Boys' Volleyball Championship =

Tournament details
- Host country: Iran
- Dates: 13–21 May
- Teams: 10
- Venue: 1 (in 1 host city)

Final positions
- Champions: Iran (5th title)

Tournament awards
- MVP: (Iran) Ramin Khani

The 2010 Asian Youth Boys' Volleyball Championship was held at the Azadi Volleyball Hall, Tehran, Iran from 13 to 21 May 2010.

== Pools composition ==
The teams were seeded based on their final ranking at the 2008 Asian Youth Boys Volleyball Championship.

Pool A	Pool B
Iran (Host & 1st); China (4th); South Korea; Australia; Sri Lanka	Japan (2nd); India (3rd); Kazakhstan; Chinese Taipei; Thailand

== Preliminary round ==
=== Pool A ===
Pos	Team	Pld	W	L	Pts	SW	SL	SR	SPW	SPL	SPR	Qualification
1	South Korea	4	4	0	8	12	4	3.000	391	340	1.150	Quarterfinals
2	Iran	4	3	1	7	10	5	2.000	347	292	1.188	Quarterfinals
3	China	4	2	2	6	9	7	1.286	361	345	1.046	Quarterfinals
4	Sri Lanka	4	1	3	5	4	10	0.400	274	341	0.804	Quarterfinals
5	Australia	4	0	4	4	3	12	0.250	312	367	0.850	

Date	Time		Score		Set 1	Set 2	Set 3	Set 4	Set 5	Total	Report
13 May	17:00	China	3–1	Australia	25–19	18–25	25–17	25–20		93–81	Report
13 May	19:00	South Korea	3–1	Sri Lanka	21–25	25–14	25–16	25–16		96–71	Report
14 May	15:00	South Korea	3–1	China	22–25	25–22	28–26	25–23		100–96	Report
14 May	17:00	Iran	3–0	Australia	25–18	25–16	25–16			75–50	Report
15 May	11:00	Sri Lanka	0–3	China	23–25	15–25	16–25			54–75	Report
15 May	17:00	Iran	1–3	South Korea	25–22	22–25	19–25	21–25		87–97	Report
16 May	11:00	Australia	1–3	South Korea	24–26	22–25	25–22	15–25		86–98	Report
16 May	17:00	Sri Lanka	0–3	Iran	13–25	20–25	15–25			48–75	Report
17 May	14:00	Australia	1–3	Sri Lanka	28–30	18–25	25–20	24–26		95–101	Report
17 May	20:00	China	2–3	Iran	22–25	25–22	13–25	25–23	12–15	97–110	Report

=== Pool B ===
Pos	Team	Pld	W	L	Pts	SW	SL	SR	SPW	SPL	SPR	Qualification
1	India	4	4	0	8	12	2	6.000	333	286	1.164	Quarterfinals
2	Japan	4	3	1	7	9	4	2.250	326	300	1.087	Quarterfinals
3	Chinese Taipei	4	2	2	6	7	9	0.778	376	360	1.044	Quarterfinals
4	Thailand	4	1	3	5	6	11	0.545	343	387	0.886	Quarterfinals
5	Kazakhstan	4	0	4	4	4	12	0.333	327	372	0.879	

Date	Time		Score		Set 1	Set 2	Set 3	Set 4	Set 5	Total	Report
13 May	10:30	India	3–0	Chinese Taipei	25–22	25–22	25–21			75–65	Report
13 May	14:30	Kazakhstan	2–3	Thailand	24–26	25–23	24–26	25–22	9–15	107–112	Report
14 May	11:00	Kazakhstan	0–3	India	17–25	18–25	18–25			53–75	Report
14 May	19:00	Japan	3–1	Chinese Taipei	25–23	21–25	25–20	38–36		109–104	Report
15 May	15:00	Thailand	2–3	India	19–25	25–23	25–20	19–25	13–15	101–108	Report
15 May	19:00	Japan	3–0	Kazakhstan	25–16	25–23	25–22			75–61	Report
16 May	14:30	Chinese Taipei	3–2	Kazakhstan	17–25	31–29	22–25	25–14	15–13	110–106	Report
16 May	19:00	Thailand	0–3	Japan	16–25	21–25	23–25			60–75	Report
17 May	16:00	India	3–0	Japan	25–23	25–21	25–23			75–67	Report
17 May	18:00	Chinese Taipei	3–1	Thailand	22–25	25–17	25–18	25–10		97–70	Report

== Classification 9th–10th ==
Date	Time		Score		Set 1	Set 2	Set 3	Set 4	Set 5	Total	Report
19 May	09:30	Australia	3–0	Kazakhstan	25–22	30–28	25–23			80–73	Report

== Final round ==
Quarterfinals
19 May – Tehran
South Korea	3
Thailand	0
19 May – Tehran
Japan	1
China	3
19 May – Tehran
India	3
Sri Lanka	1
19 May – Tehran
Iran	3
Chinese Taipei	2

Semifinals
20 May – Tehran
South Korea	0
China	3
20 May – Tehran
India	1
Iran	3

Final
21 May – Tehran
China	2
Iran	3
3rd place
21 May – Tehran
South Korea	3
India	1

5th–8th places
20 May – Tehran
Thailand	0
Japan	3
20 May – Tehran
Sri Lanka	0
Chinese Taipei	3

5th place
21 May – Tehran
Japan	3
Chinese Taipei	1
7th place
21 May – Tehran
Thailand	3
Sri Lanka	0

=== Quarterfinals ===
Date	Time		Score		Set 1	Set 2	Set 3	Set 4	Set 5	Total	Report
19 May	11:30	South Korea	3–0	Thailand	25–17	25–20	25–21			75–58	Report
19 May	14:30	India	3–1	Sri Lanka	25–22	25–18	22–25	25–18		97–83	Report
19 May	17:00	Iran	3–2	Chinese Taipei	25–20	25–19	23–25	21–25	15–9	109–98	Report
19 May	19:00	Japan	1–3	China	25–21	25–27	24–26	23–25		97–99	Report

=== 5th–8th semifinals ===
Date	Time		Score		Set 1	Set 2	Set 3	Set 4	Set 5	Total	Report
20 May	11:00	Thailand	0–3	Japan	16–25	16–25	20–25			52–75	Report
20 May	14:30	Sri Lanka	0–3	Chinese Taipei	24–26	18–25	22–25			64–76	Report

=== Semifinals ===
Date	Time		Score		Set 1	Set 2	Set 3	Set 4	Set 5	Total	Report
20 May	17:00	India	1–3	Iran	15–25	32–30	24–26	22–25		93–106	Report
20 May	19:00	South Korea	0–3	China	22–25	22–25	20–25			64–75	Report

=== 7th place ===
Date	Time		Score		Set 1	Set 2	Set 3	Set 4	Set 5	Total	Report
21 May	10:00	Thailand	3–0	Sri Lanka	25–21	25–23	25–21			75–65	Report

=== 5th place ===
Date	Time		Score		Set 1	Set 2	Set 3	Set 4	Set 5	Total	Report
21 May	13:00	Japan	3–1	Chinese Taipei	25–21	20–25	25–20	26–24		96–90	Report

=== 3rd place ===
Date	Time		Score		Set 1	Set 2	Set 3	Set 4	Set 5	Total	Report
21 May	15:00	South Korea	3–1	India	25–21	23–25	25–21	25–17		98–84	Report

=== Final ===
Date	Time		Score		Set 1	Set 2	Set 3	Set 4	Set 5	Total	Report
21 May	17:00	China	2–3	Iran	17–25	28–26	26–28	25–22	7–15	103–116	Report

== Final standing ==
Rank	Team
1st place, gold medalist(s)	Iran
2nd place, silver medalist(s)	China
3rd place, bronze medalist(s)	South Korea
4	India
5	Japan
6	Chinese Taipei
7	Thailand
8	Sri Lanka
9	Australia
10	Kazakhstan

Qualified for the 2010 Summer Youth Olympics and the 2011 FIVB Youth World Championship
Qualified for the 2011 FIVB Youth World Championship

2010 Asian Youth Boys champions

Iran
Fifth title

Team Roster
Alireza Nasr Esfahani, Ata Zeraatgar, Shahab Ahmadi, Ramin Khani, Faramarz Zarif, Armin Sadeghiani, Kamal Ghoreishi, Ali Daneshpour, Mooud Aghapour, Javad Hosseinabadi, Meisam Faridi, Babak Amiri
Head Coach: Nasser Shahnazi

== Awards ==
- MVP: (Iran) Ramin Khani
- Best scorer: (India) Anup D'Costa
- Best spiker: (South Korea) Jin Seong-tae
- Best blocker: (Iran) Armin Sadeghiani
- Best server: (China) Song Jianwei
- Best setter: (South Korea) Lee Min-gyu
- Best libero: (South Korea) Oh Jae-seong
